This is a list of European Mullard–Philips vacuum tubes and their American equivalents. Most post-war European thermionic valve (vacuum tube) manufacturers have used the Mullard–Philips tube designation naming scheme.

Special quality variants may have the letters "SQ" appended, or the device description letters may be swapped with the numerals (e.g. an E82CC is a special quality version of an ECC82)

Note: Typecode explained above. The part behind a slash ("/") is the RMA/RETMA/EIA equivalent.

A - 4 V heater

AB 
AB1 – Dual diode
AB2 – Dual diode

ABC 
ABC1 – Dual diode - triode, CBC1 with a different heater, 1930s European radios.

ABL 
ABL1 – Dual diode - power pentode, 1930s European radios.

AC 
AC2 – Triode for use as AF amplifier or as oscillator together with an AH1 mixer; side-contact 8 base, EC2 with a different heater
AC50, 4686 – 3 mAavg, 300 mApeak, Argon-filled triode thyratron, side-contact 8 base with grid on top cap, for relaxation oscillators up to 50 kHz
AC100 – Triode for use as AF amplifier or as oscillator together with an AH100 mixer; AC2 with a P5A German PTT 5-pin base
AC101 – Triode for use as AF amplifier or as oscillator together with an AH100 mixer; AC2 with a European 5-pin base
AC701 – Subminiature AF triode, 4-pin all-glass wire-ended with grid on top wire, for condenser microphone preamplifiers
AC761 – Subminiature AF triode, 4-pin all-glass wire-ended with grid on top wire, for microphone preamplifiers

ACH 
ACH1 – Triode-Hexode mixer

A D 

AD1 – 4.2 W Power triode
AD100 – 1.7 W Power triode, P7A German PTT 7-pin base
AD101 – 1.7 W Power triode, O5A European 5-pin base
AD102 – 5.5 W Power triode

AF 
AF2 – Remote-cutoff pentode
 – Remote-cutoff pentode. Identical to CF3 except for heater ratings
 – Sharp-cutoff pentode
AF100 – Wide band, sharp-cutoff pentode

AH 
AH1 – Remote-cutoff Hexode for RF gain control or modulator, CH1 with a different heater
AH100 – Remote-cutoff Hexode for RF gain control or modulator

AK 
AK1 – Octode pentagrid converter, 1930s European radios. European 7-pin base.
AK2 – Octode pentagrid converter, CK1 with a different heater, 1930s European radios, side-contact 8 base, similar to EK2.

AL 
AL1 – AF Power pentode, 1930s European radios
AL2 – AF Power pentode, 1930s European radios, side-contact 8 base.
AL3 – AF Power pentode, 1930s European radios
AL4 – AF Power pentode, 1930s European radios
AL5 – Identical to EL5 except for heater ratings
AL860 – RF/AF Power pentode, noval base

AM 
AM1 – Top-view, "Magic Cross"-type tuning indicator, EM1 with a different heater
AM2, 4677 – Top-view, "Magic Eye"-type tuning indicator, identical to CM2 and EM2 except for heater ratings

AN 
AN1 – 300 mAavg, 2 Apeak, 15 Asurge, Gas-filled triode thyratron with negative control characteristic. O5A European 5-pin base, for industrial control applications

AX 
AX1, 4652 – 500 VPIV, 125 mA Gas-filled, full-wave rectifier, European 4-pin base
AX50 – 500 VPIV, 275 mA Gas-filled, full-wave rectifier, European 4-pin base

AZ 
AZ1 – 60 mA Full-wave power rectifier, side-contact 8 base 
AZ2 – 160 mA Full-wave power rectifier, side-contact 8 base
AZ3 – 120 mA Full-wave power rectifier, side-contact 8 base
AZ4 – 200 mA Full-wave power rectifier, side-contact 8 base 
AZ11 – Full-wave power rectifier, AZ1 with Y8A 8-pin steel tube base
AZ12 – Full-wave power rectifier, AZ4 with Y8A 8-pin steel tube base
AZ21 – 120 mA Full-wave power rectifier, Loctal base
AZ31 – Full-wave power rectifier, AZ1 with 5-pin Octal base
AZ32 – Full-wave power rectifier, AZ2 with 5-pin Octal base
AZ33 – 120 mA Full-wave power rectifier, 4-pin Octal base
AZ41 – 70 mA Full-wave power rectifier, Rimlock base
AZ50 – 300 mA Full-wave power rectifier, European 4-pin base

B - 180 mA heater

BB 
BB1 – Shielded common-cathode dual diode, CB2 with a 16 V heater and a European 5-pin base with one anode on top cap

BCH 
BCH1 – Triode-hexode mixer, German Hexode base, hexode control grid on top cap, ACH1 with a 24 V heater

BL 
BL2 – Power pentode, CL2 with a 30 V heater and a European 5-pin base with the control grid on top cap

C - 200 mA heater 
Note: Many "C" tubes had 13V/200mA heaters, so apart from 1930s European AC/DC radios, these were also used in 12-Volts car radios

CB 
CB1 – Dual diode, 5-pin side-contact base, 13 V heater, 1930s European radios.
CB2 – Dual diode, 5-pin side-contact base, 13 V heater, 1930s European radios.

CBC 
CBC1 – Dual diode and triode, ABC1 with a 13 V heater, 1930s European radios.

CBL 
CBL1 – Dual diode and power pentode, 44 V heater, 1930s European radios.
CBL6 – Dual diode and power pentode, 1930s European radios.
CBL31 – Dual diode and power pentode, CBL1 with an Octal base, 1930s European radios.

CC 
CC2 – Triode, AC2 with a 13 V heater, 1930s European radios.

CCH 
CCH1 – Triode-hexode mixer, 1930s European radios.
CCH2 – Triode-hexode mixer, 1930s European radios.
CCH35 – Triode-hexode mixer, ECH3 with a different heater and base, 1930s European radios.

CF 
CF1 – Sharp-cutoff pentode, 13 V heater, 1930s European radios.
CF2 – Remote-cutoff pentode, 13 V heater, 1930s European radios.
CF3 – Remote-cutoff pentode, AF3 with a 13 V heater, 1930s European radios.
CF7 – Sharp-cutoff pentode, AF7 with a 13 V heater, 1930s European radios.
CF50 – Microphone preamplifier sharp-cutoff pentode
CF51 – Microphone preamplifier sharp-cutoff pentode

CH 
CH1 – Hexode mixer, AH1 with a 13 V heater, 1930s European radios.

CK 
CK1 – Octode pentagrid converter, AK2 with a 13 V heater, 1930s European radios.
CK3 – Octode pentagrid converter, EK3 with a different heater, 1930s European radios.

CL 
CL1 – Power pentode, 1930s European radios.
CL2 – Power pentode, BL2 with a 24 V heater, 1930s European radios.
CL4 – AF power pentode, 33 V heater, 1930s European radios.
CL6 – Power pentode, 1930s European radios.
CL33 – AF power pentode, CL4 with an octal base, 1930s European radios.

CM 
CM2 – Top-view, "Magic Eye"-type tuning indicator; has a 6.3 V/200 mA heater and was therefore marketed as C/EM2; identical to AM2 except for heater ratings

CY 
CY1 – 250 V, 80 mA Half wave rectifier, side-contact 8 base, 1930s European radios.
CY2 – Separate-cathode dual 250 V, 60 mA rectifier, side-contact 8 base, for use as half wave rectifier or as voltage doubler. 1930s European radios.
CY31 – CY1 with Octal base, 1930s European radios.
CY32 – CY2 with Octal base, 1930s European radios.

D - 1.4 V filament/heater 
Note: D-type tubes except some rectifiers are directly heated.

DA 
DA50 – Subminiature diode, 3-pin all-glass wire-ended
DA90 – Indirectly heated AM detector diode, miniature 7-pin base
DA101 – Diode, miniature 7-pin base

DAC 
DAC21 – AM detector diode and AF triode
DAC22 – AM detector diode and AF triode
DAC25 – AM detector diode and AF triode
DAC31 – AM detector diode and AF triode
DAC32 – AM detector diode and AF triode
DAC41w – AM detector diode and AF triode

DAF 
DAF11 – AM detector diode and AF pentode, wide-range heater
DAF26 – AM detector diode and AF pentode
DAF40 – AM detector diode and AF pentode
DAF41 – AM detector diode and AF pentode
DAF70 – Subminiature AM detector diode and AF pentode, all-glass wire-ended
DAF91/1S5 – AM detector diode and AF pentode, miniature 7-pin base
DAF92 – AM detector diode and AF pentode, miniature 7-pin base
DAF96/1AH5 – AM detector diode and AF pentode, miniature 7-pin base
DAF191 – AM detector diode and AF pentode, miniature 7-pin base
DAF961 – AM detector diode and AF pentode, miniature 7-pin base

DAH 
DAH50 – Low voltage diode-heptode with a space charge grid

DBC 
DBC21 – Dual diode and Triode

DC 
 – AF driver triode for DDD11, wide-range heater
 – AF driver triode for DDD25
DC41w – Driver triode
DC70/6375 – Subminiature UHF triode for walkie-talkies, all-glass wire-ended
DC80/1E3 – Triode, oscillator/mixer/amplifier
DC90 – Triode, FM receiver oscillator/mixer/amplifier, miniature 7-pin base
DC96 – Triode, FM receiver oscillator/mixer/amplifier, miniature 7-pin base
DC760 – Subminiature electrometer inverted triode for probes, all-glass wire-ended
DC761 – Subminiature UHF triode, all-glass wire-ended
DC762 – Subminiature electrometer inverted triode for probes, 100 fA grid current, all-glass wire-ended
—Special quality:
D1C (957) – Acorn UHF triode
D2C (958) – Acorn UHF triode

DCC 
DCC90 – Dual triode, RF amplifier or oscillator, miniature 7-pin base

DCF 
DCF60/1V6 – Triode and pentode, oscillator/mixer, all-glass 7-pin wire-ended

DCH 
DCH11 – Remote-cutoff triode/hexode mixer, wide-range heater
DCH21 – Remote-cutoff triode/hexode mixer
DCH25 – Remote-cutoff triode/hexode mixer
DCH41w – Remote-cutoff triode/hexode mixer

DD 
DD960 – VHF power triode, miniature 7-pin base

DDD 
 – Dual AF power triode, wide-range heater – preferred driver is DC11
 – Dual AF power triode – preferred driver is DC25
DDD41w – Dual power triode

DF 
DF11 – Remote-cutoff RF/IF pentode, wide-range heater
DF21 – Sharp-cutoff RF/IF/AF pentode
DF22 – Remote-cutoff RF/IF pentode
DF25 – Remote-cutoff RF/IF pentode
DF26 – Sharp-cutoff RF/IF pentode
DF33 – Remote-cutoff RF/IF pentode
DF41w – Remote-cutoff RF/IF pentode
DF60/5678 – Subminiature sharp-cutoff RF/IF/AF pentode, all-glass wire-ended
DF61 – Subminiature sharp-cutoff RF or mixer pentode, all-glass wire-ended
DF62/1AD4 – Subminiature sharp-cutoff RF pentode, all-glass wire-ended, for use as RF/IF stage
DF63 – Subminiature remote-cutoff RF pentode, all-glass wire-ended, for use as RF/IF stage
DF64 – Subminiature AF pentode, all-glass wire-ended, for use in hearing aids
DF65 – Subminiature AF pentode, all-glass wire-ended, for use in hearing aids
DF66 – Subminiature AF pentode, all-glass wire-ended, for use in hearing aids
DF67/6008 – Subminiature AF pentode, all-glass wire-ended, for use in hearing aids
DF70 – Subminiature AF pentode, all-glass wire-ended, for use in hearing aids
DF72 – Subminiature sharp-cutoff RF pentode, all-glass wire-ended, for use as RF/IF stage
DF73 – Subminiature remote-cutoff RF pentode, all-glass wire-ended, for use as RF/IF stage
DF91/1T4 – Remote-cutoff RF/IF pentode, miniature 7-pin base
DF92/1L4 – Sharp-cutoff RF/IF pentode, miniature 7-pin base
DF96/1AJ4 – Remote-cutoff RF/IF pentode, miniature 7-pin base
DF97/1AN5 – Remote-cutoff RF/IF pentode, miniature 7-pin base
DF161 – Subminiature AF pentode, all-glass wire-ended, for use in hearing aids
DF167 – Subminiature AF pentode, all-glass wire-ended, for use in hearing aids
DF191 – RF pentode, miniature 7-pin base
DF651 (CK549DX) – Subminiature AF pentode, all-glass wire-ended, for use in hearing aids
DF668 – Subminiature RF pentode, all-glass wire-ended
DF669 – Subminiature RF/IF pentode, all-glass wire-ended
DF703 (5886) – Subminiature electrometer pentode, envelope has a moisture-repellent coating, all-glass wire-ended, for probe amplifiers
DF904/1U4/5910 – Sharp-cutoff SW/VHF pentode, miniature 7-pin base
DF906 – Sharp-cutoff SW/VHF pentode, miniature 7-pin base
DF961 – Sharp-cutoff SW/VHF pentode, miniature 7-pin base
—Special quality:
D1F – D11F with a hand grip
D2F – D12F with a hand grip
D3F (959) – Acorn VHF pentode
D11F – Acorn remote-cutoff RF/IF/AF pentode for portable transceivers
D12F – Acorn RF/IF/AF pentode for portable transceivers

DK 
DK21 – Octode beam pentagrid converter
DK32/1A7 – Heptode pentagrid converter
DK40 – Octode pentagrid converter
DK91/1R5 – Heptode pentagrid converter, miniature 7-pin base
DK92/1AC6 – Heptode pentagrid converter, miniature 7-pin base
DK96/1AB6 – Heptode pentagrid converter, miniature 7-pin base
DK192 – Heptode pentagrid converter, miniature 7-pin base
DK962 – Heptode pentagrid converter, miniature 7-pin base

DL 
DL11 – 350 mW AF Power pentode, wide-range heater
DL21 – 700 mW AF Power pentode
DL25 – Power pentode
DL29/3D6 – Power pentode
DL33/3Q5GT – 400 mW AF Power pentode
DL35 – 400 mW Power pentode
DL41 – 600 mW Power pentode
DL41w – Bowl Power pentode
DL64 – Subminiature AF power pentode, all-glass wire-ended, for use in hearing aids, VA = 15 V, VAmax = 45 V
DL65 – Subminiature AF power pentode, all-glass wire-ended, for use in hearing aids, DL67/6007 with a different pinout, VA = 22.5 V, VAmax = 45 V
DL66 – Subminiature AF power pentode, all-glass wire-ended, for use in hearing aids, VA = 22.5 V, VAmax = 45 V
DL67/6007 – Subminiature AF power pentode, all-glass wire-ended, for use in hearing aids, DL65 with a different pinout, VA = 22.5 V, VAmax = 45 V
DL68 – Subminiature AF power pentode, all-glass wire-ended, for use in hearing aids, VA = 22.5 V, VAmax = 45 V
DL69 – Subminiature power pentode, all-glass wire-ended, VA = 90 V
DL70 – Subminiature VHF power pentode up to 200 MHz, all-glass wire-ended, for use in walkie-talkies, VA = 150 V
DL71 – Subminiature AF power pentode, all-glass wire-ended, for use in hearing aids, VA = 22.5 V, VAmax = 45 V
DL72 – Subminiature AF power pentode, all-glass wire-ended, for use in hearing aids, VAmax = 45 V
DL73 (CV2299) – Subminiature VHF power pentode up to 200 MHz, all-glass wire-ended, for use in walkie-talkies, VA = 150 V
DL91/1S4 – 270 mW AF Power pentode, miniature 7-pin base
DL92/3S4 – 270 mW AF Power pentode, miniature 7-pin base
DL93/3A4 – 700 mW RF/AF Power pentode, miniature 7-pin base
DL94/3V4 – 270 mW AF Power pentode, miniature 7-pin base
DL95/3Q4 – 270 mW AF Power pentode, miniature 7-pin base
DL96/3C4 – 200 mW AF Power pentode, miniature 7-pin base
DL98/3B4 – 1.25 W RF power pentode up to 100 MHz, miniature 7-pin base
DL161 – Subminiature AF power pentode, all-glass wire-ended, for use in hearing aids
DL167 – 1.8 mW Subminiature AF power pentode, all-glass wire-ended, for use in hearing aids
DL192 – 150 mW AF Power pentode, miniature 7-pin base
DL193 – 650 mW AF Power pentode, miniature 7-pin base
DL620 – 110 mW Subminiature power pentode, all-glass wire-ended, VAmax = 90 V
DL907 – SW/VHF power pentode, miniature 7-pin base
DL962 – 150 mW AF power pentode, miniature 7-pin base
DL963 – RF/AF power pentode, miniature 7-pin base

DLL 
DLL21 – 1.5 W AF Dual power pentode
DLL101 – Dual power pentode, miniature 7-pin base
DLL102 – Dual power pentode, miniature 7-pin base

DM 
DM21 – Top-view, "Magic Eye"-type tuning indicator
DM70/1M3 – Side-view, subminiature band-and-dot-type tuning/level indicator, all-glass wire-ended
DM71/1N3 – Side-view, subminiature band-and-dot-type tuning/level indicator, all-glass wire-ended
DM160/6977 (ИВ-15) – First vacuum fluorescent display, single segment, side-view, for use as flip-flop status indicator in transistorized computers. All-glass wire-ended

DY 
DY30 – 30 kV CRT EHT rectifier
DY51 – Half-indirectly-heated 15 kV portable-TV CRT EHT rectifier, filament internally connected to cathode, all-glass, filament wire-ends on one end, anode wire-end on the other
DY70 – 10 kV CRT EHT rectifier, 3-pin all-glass wire-ended, anode on top wire
DY80 – 23 kV CRT EHT rectifier, noval base
/1S2 – Half-indirectly-heated 18 kV CRT EHT rectifier, noval base, filament internally connected to cathode. Identical to EY86 except for heater ratings
/1S2A – DY86/1S2 with chemically treated envelope to avoid flush-over in high-humidity and low atmospheric-pressure conditions. Identical to EY87 except for heater ratings
 – Half-indirectly-heated 20 kV CRT EHT rectifier, noval base, filament internally connected to cathode. Identical to EY802 except for heater ratings
DY900 – Half-indirectly-heated 16 kV CRT EHT rectifier, miniature 7-pin base, filament internally connected to cathode

E - 6.3 V heater

EA 
EA40 – 7 kV, 25 mA Diode, 4-pin Rimlock base
EA50/2B35 – Diode for TV detectors, 3+1-pin all-glass subminiature with anode on top pin
EA52/6923 – Instrumentation rectifier diode up to 1 GHz, Rocket-type disk-seal tube
EA53 – Co-axial instrumentation rectifier diode up to 1 GHz, Rocket-type disk-seal tube
EA76 – Diode, 5-pin all-glass wire-ended
EA111 – Diode for time bases, Y8A 8-pin steel tube base
EA766 – Diode, 5-pin all-glass wire-ended
EA960 – 100 VPIV VHF Diode, miniature 7-pin base
EA961 – 2 kVPIV VHF Diode, miniature 7-pin base
EA962 – 100 VPIV VHF Diode with extremely small distance between cathode and anode for extended frequency range, miniature 7-pin base

EAA 
EAA11 – Dual diode, Y8A 8-pin steel tube base
EAA91/6AL5 – Dual diode with separate cathodes, miniature 7-pin base, identical to HAA91/12AL5, UAA91 and XAA91/3AL5 except for heater ratings, EB91 with a shorter envelope
EAA171 – Dual diode, separate cathodes, gnome tube
EAA901S/5726 – Dual RF diode, miniature 7-pin base
—Special quality:
E91AA – Dual diode, miniature 7-pin base

EAB 
EAB1 – Triple diode with common cathode

EABC 
/6AK8 – High-mu triode, triple low-voltage diode (two on common cathode with triode, one with independent cathode). Noval base, used as an AF amplifier, AM detector and ratio detector in AC-powered post-war European AM/FM radios. Electronically identical to American types 6AK8 (usually marked 6AK8/EABC80), 6T8, and 6T8A; also DH719. Identical to 5T8, 6T8, HABC80/19T8, PABC80/9AK8 and UABC80/27AK8 except for heater ratings

EAC 
EAC91 – Diode/triode UHF mixer

EAF 
EAF21 – Diode - pentode, UAF21 with a different heater
EAF41 – Diode - remote-cutoff RF/IF/AF pentode, Rimlock base, UAF41 with a different heater
EAF42/6CT7 – Diode - remote-cutoff RF/IF/AF pentode, Rimlock base
EAF801 – Diode - remote-cutoff pentode, Noval base

EAM 
EAM86/6GX8 – Diode - side-view, band-type tuning/level indicator

EB 
EB1 – Low-power dual diode
EB2 – Low-power dual diode
EB4 – Low-power dual diode, EB11 or EB34 with a side-contact 8 base
EB11 – Low-power dual diode, EB4 or EB34 with a Y8A 8-pin steel tube base
EB34 – Low-power dual diode, EB4 or EB11 with an Octal base
EB40 – Low-power dual diode
EB41 – Low-power dual diode
EB91 – Dual diode with separate cathodes, miniature 7-pin base, for FM ratio detectors, EAA91/6AL5 with a longer envelope

EBC 
EBC1 – Low-power dual diode and triode, ABC1 with a different heater
EBC3 – Low-power dual diode and triode
EBC11 – Low-power dual diode and triode
EBC33 – Low-power dual diode and triode, EBC3 with an Octal base
EBC41 – Low-power dual diode and triode, EBC81/6BD7A with a Rimlock base
EBC81/6BD7A – Low-power dual diode and triode, EBC41 with a Noval base
EBC90/6AT6 – High-mu triode and common cathode dual diode, miniature 7-pin base, HBC90/12AT6 with a different heater
EBC91/6AV6 – High-mu AF triode and common cathode dual diode, for use in FM ratio detectors, miniature 7-pin base, HBC91/12AV6 with a different heater

EBF 
EBF2 – Common-cathode dual diode and remote-cutoff RF/IF/AF pentode, EBF11 or EBF35 with a side-contact 8 base
EBF11 – Common-cathode dual diode and RF/IF/AF pentode, EBF2 or EBF35 with a Y8A 8-pin steel tube base, VBF11 with different heater ratings
EBF15 – Dual diode and pentode, UBF15 with a different heater
EBF32 – Common-cathode dual diode and remote-cutoff RF/IF pentode, Octal base with g1 on cap
EBF35 – Common-cathode dual diode and remote-cutoff RF/IF pentode, identical to EBF2 and EBF11 except for Octal base with g1 on cap
EBF80/6N8 (WD709) – Common-cathode dual diode and remote-cutoff pentode, noval base
EBF83/6DR8 – Common-cathode dual diode and pentode, anode voltage 6 to 50 V, for use as IF amplifier, detector and AGC diode in vehicle equipment, noval base
EBF89/6DC8/7125 – Common-cathode dual diode and RF/IF pentode, noval base
EBF171 – Dual Diode and remote-cutoff RF/IF/AF pentode; the first gnome tube, a modified and repackaged EBF11

EBL 
EBL1 – Dual diode and power pentode, identical to EBL21 and EBL31 except for side-contact 8 base, and heater ratings
EBL21 (WD709) – Dual diode and power pentode, identical to EBL1 and EBL31 except for B8G Loctal base, and heater ratings
EBL31 – Dual diode and power pentode, identical to EBL1 and EBL21 except for Octal base, and heater ratings
EBL71 – Dual diode and power pentode

EC 
EC2 – Triode for use as AF amplifier or as oscillator, side-contact 8 base, AC2 with a different heater
EC40 – VHF Triode up to 500 MHz, EC80 with a Rimlock base
EC41 – UHF oscillator triode, EC81 with a Rimlock base
EC50 – Helium-filled triode thyratron for use as a horizontal sweep, sawtooth waveform generator in oscilloscopes
EC52 – RF triode for use as an oscillator, B9G 9-pin Loctal base
EC53 – VHF triode for use as an oscillator up to 600 MHz
EC55/5861 (R243) – 3 GHz, 10 W Disk-seal UHF triode
EC56 – 4 GHz Disk-seal microwave triode
EC57 (EC157) – Disk-seal microwave triode
EC70/6778 – Subminiature UHF triode for use as an oscillator in the 500 MHz range, 8-pin all-glass wire-ended
EC71/5718 – Subminiature UHF triode up tp 1 GHz, for use as an oscillator in the 500 MHz range, 8-pin all-glass wire-ended
EC80/6Q4 – VHF Triode up to 500 MHz
EC81/6R4 – UHF oscillator triode
EC84/6AJ4 – High-mu triode
EC86/6CM4 – UHF triode, PC86/4CM4 with a different heater
EC88/6DL4 – UHF triode, PC88/4DL4 with a different heater. This and the EC86 were often encountered in UHF TV tuners, the latter as a self oscillating mixer
EC90/6C4 – 3.6 W Small-power VHF triode up to 150 MHz; single ECC82/12AU7 system
EC91/6AQ4 – VHF triode up to 250 MHz
EC92/6AB4 – VHF triode for FM receiver frontends, single ECC81/12AT7 system, UC92/9AB4 with a different heater
EC94/6AF4 – UHF mixer/oscillator triode
EC95 – VHF triode with variable mutual conductance, PC95 with a different heater
EC97/6FY5 – Frame-grid VHF triode, identical to PC97/4FY5 and XC97 except for heater ratings
EC98 – UHF triode
EC157/8108 – 4 GHz, 12.5 W Disk-seal microwave triode
EC158 – Low-voltage, 4 GHz, 30 W disk-seal microwave triode
EC760 (5718) – Subminiature VHF mixer/oscillator triode up to 500 MHz, 7-pin all-glass wire-ended
EC860 – 20 mAavg, 500 mApk Helium-filled grid-turn-off triode thyratron e.g. for relaxation oscillators up to 150 kHz, noval base
EC900 – VHF triode, PC900 with a different heater
—Special quality:
EC1000 – Triode for use as amplifier in probes
EC1030 – Indirectly heated UHF triode, hot-standby (no cathode current) resistant, all-glass wire-ended with 8 tinned, 38 mm long wires
EC1031 – EC1030 with 5.5 mm long, gold-plated pins for insertion into a special socket
EC8010 – UHF triode for use as amplifier or oscillator up to 1 GHz
EC8020 – UHF triode
E1C, 4671 (955) – Acorn UHF triode
E20C – RF triode for wide band cascode circuits, B8G Loctal base
E86C (EC806S) – UHF triode up to 800 MHz, gold-plated pins
E88C/8255 – UHF triode for grounded-grid amplifiers, up to 1 GHz

ECC 
ECC32/6SN7 – Separate cathodes dual AF triode, octal base
ECC33 – Separate cathodes, high-mu dual triode for use as a flip-flop, octal base
ECC34 – Separate cathodes, dual triode for use as a CRT vertical-deflection power multivibrator, octal base
ECC35/6SL7 – Separate cathodes, high-mu AF dual triode, octal base
ECC40 – Separate cathodes, AF dual triode, Rimlock base
ECC70/6021 – Separate cathodes, subminiature VHF medium-mu dual triode, 8-pin all-glass wire-ended
ECC81/12AT7 (6060, M8162, B309) – High-mu dual triode, for use as RF amplifier/mixer in VHF circuits, noval base. Two EC92/6AB4s in one envelope, the ECC81 being specified with the same frequency characteristics as the EC92.
ECC82/12AU7 (6067, M8136, B329) – Medium-mu dual triode for use as AF amplifier, noval base, identical to XCC82 except for heater ratings. Two EC90/6C4s in one envelope; however, the ECC82 is only specified as an audio frequency device.
ECC83/12AX7 (6057, M8137, B339) – High-mu dual triode for use as a high-gain AF amplifier, noval base 
/6CW7 – Dual VHF triode for grounded-grid/cascode amplifiers in TV tuners; section 1 cathode is connected to two adjacent pins and the screen between the two sections is internally connected to the section 2 grid; noval base. Identical to PCC84/7AN7 and UCC84 except for heater ratings
ECC85/6AQ8 – Dual triode for use as VHF oscillator/mixer up to 200 MHz, noval base, identical to HCC85/17EW8, PCC85/9AQ8 and UCC85 except for heater ratings
ECC86/6GM8 – Dual low (6.3-25 V) anode voltage triode, noval base, for use in VHF tuners in vehicle equipment 
ECC87 (E80CC/6085) – ECC40 with a Noval base, allowing for a heater center-tap
ECC88/6DJ8 – Dual triode used as cascode RF amplifier in TV tuners and VHF receiver front ends, or as general-purpose instrumentation dual triode, noval base, PCC88/7DJ8 with a different heater 
ECC89/6FC7 – Dual Triode used as cascode RF amplifier in TV tuners and VHF receiver front ends, or as general-purpose instrumentation dual triode, noval base
Notes:
All ECC8x have separate cathodes
ECC81, 82 & 83 have the individual triode heaters internally series-connected, with the midpoint on a separate pin, so they could be run on both 6.3 V and 12.6 V (hence RETMA lists them as 12V types), which was useful in dual-system (6V and 12V) car radios
All other ECC8x have no heater midpoint tap; ECC85, 86 & 88 have the freed-up pin being used for an internal screen between the sections
ECC91/6J6 – Common cathode dual VHF triode, miniature 7-pin base
ECC92 – Common cathode dual triode for use as a flip-flop in computers, miniature 7-pin base
ECC99 – Separate cathodes dual RF triode, noval base
ECC171 – Separate cathodes and separate heaters dual triode, 11-pin gnome tube with internal shield
ECC180/6BQ7A – Separate cathodes, dual VHF triode for cascode amplifiers
ECC186/7316 – Separate cathodes, dual triode for use in digital computers, withstands zero cathode current for extended periods of time
ECC189/6ES8 – Separate cathodes, dual variable-mu VHF triode for cascode amplifiers; identical to PCC189/7ES8, XCC189/4ES8 and YCC189/5ES8 except for heater ratings
ECC230/6AS7G/6080 – Separate cathodes, dual low-mu power triode for use as series regulator in DC power supplies, servo applications, or as a horizontal booster triode in TV monitors, Octal base
ECC802 – Separate cathodes, dual AF triode
ECC803 – Separate cathodes, dual low-microphonics AF triode
ECC807 – Separate cathodes, dual AF triode for high-gain preamplifiers
ECC808/6KX8 – Separate cathodes, dual AF triode for use as record head output tube in tape recorders
ECC812 – Separate cathodes, dual shielded triode for color TV chrominance outputs in SECAM TV receivers
ECC832/12DW7/7247 – Dual AF triode, a combination of one ECC83/12AX7 system for use as a high-gain amplifier and one ECC82/12AU7 system for use as a phase inverter or cathode follower
ECC960 – Common cathode, dual triode for use as a flip-flop in computers
—Special quality:
ECC2000 – VHF separate cathodes, dual triode with neutralization screen, for use in cascode amplifiers up to 300 MHz, 10-pin Decal base
ECC8100 – VHF separate cathodes, dual triode with neutralization screen ("Neutrode") connected to the heater, for use in cascode amplifiers, noval base
E80CC/6085 – Separate cathodes, dual triode for use as DC or AF amplifier
E81CC/ECC801S/6201 – Separate cathodes, dual triode for AF and RF amplifiers, mixers up to 300 MHz, oscillators, impulse circuits; withstands zero cathode current for extended periods of time
E82CC/ECC802S/6189 – Separate cathodes, dual triode for use as amplifier or multivibrator
E83CC/6681 (ECC803S/6057) – Separate cathodes, low-microphonics dual triode
E88CC/6922 – Separate cathodes, dual triode, gold-plated pins
E90CC/5920 – Common cathode, dual triode for use as a flip-flop in computers
E92CC – Common cathode, dual triode for use as a flip-flop in computers
E180CC/7062 – Separate cathodes, dual triode for use as a flip-flop in computers
E181CC – Separate cathodes, dual triode for use in digital computers, withstands zero cathode current for extended periods of time
E182CC/7119 – Separate cathodes, dual triode for use as a flip-flop in computers
E188CC/7308 – Separate cathodes, dual triode for use as RF/IF/AF amplifier
E283CC – Separate cathodes, dual triode for use as AF or instrumentation amplifier
E288CC/8223 – Separate cathodes, dual triode for use in IF, RF and cascode amplifiers

ECF 
ECF1 – Triode - Pentode
ECF12 – Triode - Pentode
ECF80/6BL8 – VHF mixer/oscillator triode/pentode, identical to LCF80/6LN8, PCF80/9A8, UCF80 and XCF80/4BL8 except for heater ratings
/6U8 – Triode - Pentode. Identical to PCF82/9U8A and XCF82 except for heater ratings
ECF83 – Triode - remote-cutoff pentode, low microphonics, for vehicle equipment
ECF86/6HG8 – VHF mixer/oscillator triode/pentode, identical to LCF86/5HG8, PCF86/7HG8, 8HG8 and XCF86/4HG8 except for heater ratings
ECF174 – Triode and pentode, gnome tube
ECF200/6X9 – Triode and pentode for use as IF amplifier in TV receivers, decal base, PCF200 with a different heater
ECF201/6U9 – Triode and pentode for use as IF amplifier and sync sep in TV receivers, decal base, identical to LCF201/5U9 and PCF201 except for heater ratings
ECF202 – Triode and pentode for use as SECAM chroma signal demodulators in analog color TV receivers, decal base
ECF801/6GJ7 – Triode and pentode for use as VHF mixer in TV receivers, noval base, identical to LCF801/5GJ7, PCF801/8GJ7 and XCF801/4GJ7 except for heater ratings
ECF802/6JW8 – Triode and pentode for use as reactance and sinewave oscillator in TV receivers, noval base, identical to LCF802/6LX8, PCF802/9JW8 and 5JW8 except for heater ratings
ECF804 – Triode and pentode for use as wide band amplifier, noval base, PCF804 with a different heater
ECF805 – Triode and pentode, noval base, PCF805/7GV7 with a different heater
ECF812 = 6FL2 – Triode and beam tetrode, noval base, PCF812 (=30FL2) with a different heater
—Special quality:
ECF8070 – Triode - Pentode
E80CF/7643 – Triode - pentode

ECH 
ECH3 – Triode/hexode oscillator/mixer, ECH33 with a side-contact 8 base
ECH4 – Triode/heptode oscillator/mixer, ECH21 with a side-contact 8 base
ECH11 (X143) – Triode/hexode oscillator/mixer, VCH11 with a different heater
ECH21 (X143) – Triode/heptode oscillator/mixer, ECH4 with a B8G Loctal base
ECH33 – Triode/hexode oscillator/mixer, ECH3 with an Octal base
ECH35 (X147) – Triode/hexode oscillator/mixer
ECH41 – Triode/hexode oscillator/mixer
ECH42/6CU7 – Triode/hexode oscillator/mixer, UCH42 with a different heater
ECH43 – Triode/hexode oscillator/mixer, low-microphonics version of ECH42; UCH43 with a different heater
ECH71 – Triode/heptode oscillator/mixer
ECH80/6AN7 – Triode-hexode oscillator/mixer
ECH81/6AJ8 (X719) – Triode/heptode oscillator/mixer, XCH81 with a different heater
ECH83/6DS8 – Low (6.3-25 V) anode voltage, Triode/heptode oscillator/mixer, for use in vehicle equipment
ECH84 – Triode/heptode oscillator/mixer
ECH171 – Triode/remote-cutoff heptode Mixer, gnome tube
ECH200 – Triode/heptode, for TV sync sep, PCH200 with a different heater
—Special quality:
ECH8000 – Triode/remote-cutoff heptode oscillator/mixer

ECL 
ECL11 – Triode - power tetrode
ECL80/6AB8 – Triode - power pentode
 – Triode - power pentode. Identical to PCL81 except for heater ratings
/6BM8 – AF triode - AF power pentode, identical to PCL82/16A8, UCL82/50BM8 and XCL82 except for heater ratings 
ECL83 – Triode - power pentode, PCL83 with a different heater
ECL84/6DX8 – TV sync sep triode - CRT cathode drive power pentode, identical to LCL84/10DX8, PCL84/15DQ8 and XCL84/8DX8 except for heater ratings
ECL85/6GV8 – Triode - power pentode used in TV receivers for vertical timebase, generally as a multivibrator, with the pentode section doubling as one half of the multivibrator and the power output device, identical to LCL85/10GV8, PCL85/18GV8 and XCL85/9GV8 except for heater ratings
ECL86/6GW8 – AF Triode - AF power pentode, used for audio amplification in European TV receivers, PCL86/14GW8 with a different heater
ECL113 – Triode - AF power pentode, Rimlock base
ECL200 – Triode - CRT drive power pentode, decal base, PCL200 with a different heater
ECL802 – Triode - Power pentode for use as vertical oscillator and output tube in TV receivers
ECL805 – Triode - Power pentode with separate cathodes, PCL805 with a different heater

ECLL 
ECLL800 – Triode and dual screened power pentode, for 9.2 W (Class-B) or 8.5 W (Class-AB) AF push-pull power amplifiers. The triode shares its control grid with the 1st pentode and acts as a phase inverter for the 2nd pentode; both pentodes share screen and suppressor grids; noval base

ED 
ED111 – 6 W VHF power triode up to 85 MHz
ED500 – Identical to PD500 except for heater ratings; considerable x-radiation despite the envelope being fabricated from lead glass
ED501 – 27 kV Color CRT EHT shunt stabilizer triode
—Special quality:
ED8000 – Power triode for use in series-pass voltage regulators

EDD 
EDD11 – Dual power triode
EDD171 – Dual high-mu power triode, gnome tube

EE 
EE58L - RF Output Triode, used at ATC transponders (used in Collins TDR-90 transponder).
EE1 (EEP1, 4696) – Single-ended secondary emission amplifier for use as a wide band amplifier and phase inverter
EE50 – Single-ended secondary emission amplifier for use in TV receivers, B9G 9-pin Loctal base

EEL 
EEL71 – AF Tetrode - AF power pentode, B8G Loctal base, for use as audion detector, AF preamplifier, AF power amplifier
EEL171 – Remote-cutoff tetrode and 4-Watt power pentode, gnome tube

EEP 
EEP1 See EE1

EF 
EF1 – RF/IF Pentode
EF2 – Remote-cutoff RF/IF pentode
EF3 – Remote-cutoff RF/IF pentode
EF5 – Remote-cutoff pentode
EF6 – AF Pentode, EF36 with a side-contact 8 base
EF7 – RF/IF Pentode
EF8 – Selektode, a remote-cutoff pentode with a beam-forming extra grid between control and screen grids, intended to reduce screen current and hence anode/screen grid distribution noise (technically a hexode), EF38 with a side-contact 8 base
EF9 – Pentode, EF22/7B7, EF39/6K7 or EF41/6CJ5 with a side-contact 8 base with control grid on top cap
EF11 – Remote-cutoff pentode, Y8A 8-pin steel tube base
EF12 – Pentode, Y8A 8-pin steel tube base
EF13 – Remote-cutoff pentode
EF14 – Sharp-cutoff pentode, Y8A 8-pin steel tube base, identical to UF14 and VF14 except for heater ratings
EF15 – Remote-cutoff pentode, UF15 with a different heater
EF22 – Pentode, EF9, EF39/6K7 and EF41/6CJ5 with a B8G Loctal base
EF27 – Pentode
EF36 – Pentode, EF6 with an Octal base
EF37/6J7 – Sharp-cutoff pentode for use as a tuned RF amplifier, a (second) detector, or an AF amplifier; octal base with control grid on top-cap
EF38 – EF8 with an Octal base
EF39/6K7 – Remote-cutoff RF pentode for use as an IF amplifier or as a superheterodyne mixer (1st detector). Also used in test equipment. EF4, EF22 and EF41/6CJ5 with an Octal base with control grid on top-cap
EF40 – AF Pentode
EF41/6CJ5 (62VP) – Remote-cutoff pentode, EF4, EF22/7B7 or EF39/6K7 with a Rimlock base
EF42 – Pentode, EF52 with a Rimlock base
EF43 – Remote-cutoff pentode
EF50 (EF53) – Remote-cutoff pentode for use in the IF stages of 1940s TV and radar receivers, B9G 9-pin Loctal base 
EF51 – Remote-cutoff pentode
EF52 – Pentode, EF42 with a B8G Loctal base
EF54 – Pentode, B9G 9-pin Loctal base
EF55 – Pentode, B9G 9-pin Loctal base
EF70 – Subminiature pentode, suppressor grid available on separate wire-end and internally connected to a separate diode to prevent positive grid voltage, for use as a NAND gate in coincidence circuits; all-glass 8-pin wire-ended
EF71/5899 – Subminiature remote-cutoff pentode, all-glass 8-pin wire-ended
EF72 – Subminiature sharp-cutoff RF pentode, all-glass 8-pin wire-ended
EF73 – Subminiature AF pentode, all-glass 8-pin wire-ended
EF74 – Subminiature, low-microphonics pentode, all-glass 8-pin wire-ended
EF80/6BX6 (Z152) – Sharp-cutoff RF/IF/Video pentode, noval base 
EF83 – Remote-cutoff AF pentode, Noval base 
EF85/6BY7 (W719) – Remote-cutoff wideband RF pentode, noval base, identical to HF85 and XF85 except for heater ratings

EF86/6BK8 (6267, Z729) – AF Pentode. Identical to PF86 and UF86 except for heater ratings, Noval base 
EF89/6DA6 – Remote-cutoff VHF pentode, Noval base
EF91/6AM6 (6064, Z77, M8083, 8D3) – Sharp-cutoff pentode, Miniature 7-pin base
EF92/6CQ6 (M8161) – Remote-cutoff RF pentode, Miniature 7-pin base
EF93/6BA6 (W727) – Remote-cutoff RF pentode, miniature 7-pin base, HF93/12BA6 with a different heater
EF94/6AU6 – Sharp-cutoff RF/IF/AF pentode, miniature 7-pin base, identical to HF94/12AU6 and XF94/3AU6 except for heater ratings
EF95/6AK5 (5654, 408A, 6J1P (6Ж1П), CV4010) – RF Pentode, Miniature 7-pin base 
EF96/6AG5 – Pentode, Miniature 7-pin base
EF97/6ES6 – Low (6.3-50 V) anode voltage, remote-cutoff RF/IF pentode, for use in vehicle equipment, Miniature 7-pin base
EF98/6ET6 – Low (6.3-50 V) anode voltage, sharp-cutoff pentode, for use as oscillator or IF/AF amplifier in vehicle equipment, Miniature 7-pin base
EF111 – Remote-cutoff pentode, Y8A 8-pin steel tube base
EF112 – Pentode, Y8A 8-pin steel tube base
EF172 – RF/IF/AF Pentode, gnome tube
EF174 – Pentode, gnome tube
EF175 – Remote-cutoff RF/IF pentode, gnome tube
EF176 – VHF Pentode, gnome tube
EF177 – VHF Pentode, gnome tube
EF183/6EH7 – Frame grid, remote-cutoff IF pentode for use in TV receivers, identical to LF183/YF183/4EH7 and XF183/3EH7 except for heater ratings
EF184/6EJ7 – Frame-grid, sharp-cutoff IF pentode for use in TV receivers, identical to LF184/YF184/4EJ7 and XF184/3EJ7 except for heater ratings
EF410 – RF/IF Pentode, Rimlock base
EF730/5636 – Subminiature dual-control, sharp-cutoff RF/IF pentode for use as a gated or gain-controlled amplifier, 8-pin all-glass wire-ended, similar to 5784
EF731 – Subminiature remote-cutoff RF pentode, 8-pin all-glass wire-ended
EF732 – Subminiature sharp-cutoff RF pentode, 8-pin all-glass wire-ended
EF734 – Subminiature sharp-cutoff RF pentode, 8-pin all-glass wire-ended
EF762 – Subminiature sharp-cutoff RF/IF pentode, 8-pin all-glass wire-ended
EF800 – Long-life sharp-cutoff RF/IF pentode
EF802 – Long-life RF/IF pentode
EF804 – AF low-hum, low-microphonics pentode
EF816 – Dual-anode pentode for TV receiver sync separation service
 – Long-life sharp-cutoff RF pentode for use as preamplifier in telecomms wide-area receivers. Identical to IF860 except for heater ratings (300mA)
—Special quality:
EF804S – Ruggedized, long-life version of EF804
EF805S – Long-life remote-cutoff RF/IF pentode
EF806S – Ruggedized, long-life AF pentode
EF5000 – secondary emission wide band pentode, noval base
EF8010 – Remote-cutoff RF/IF pentode
E1F (954, 4672) – Acorn UHF pentode
E2F (956, 4695) – Acorn UHF pentode
E3F – E13F with a hand grip
E13F – Acorn remote-cutoff RF/IF/AF signal/power pentode for portable transceivers
E80F/6084 – AF pentode, gold-plated pins
E83F/6689 – Long-life, wide band pentode for use in telephone equipment, gold-plated pins
E90F/6BH6/7693 – RF Pentode
E95F/6AK5W/5654 – Pentode
E99F/6BJ6/7694 – Remote-cutoff RF pentode
E180F/6688 – Wide band pentode, wideband amplifier for professional equipment
E186F/7737 – Wide band pentode, wideband amplifier
E280F/7722 – Wide band pentode, wideband amplifier
E282F – Pentode, wideband amplifier up to 250 MHz
E810F/7788 – Wide band pentode, gold-plated pins

EFF 
EFF51 – Dual VHF pentode up to 500 MHz, B9G 9-pin Loctal base

EFL 
EFL200/6Y9 – Sync sep pentode and CRT cathode drive power pentode, decal base; identical to LFL200/11Y9 and PFL200/16Y9 except for heater ratings

EFM 
EFM1 – Variable-mu AF pentode - top-view, "Magic Eye"-type tuning indicator
EFM11 – Variable-mu AF pentode - top-view, "Magic Eye"-type tuning indicator

EFP 
EFP60 – Secondary emission pentode for TV amplifiers, B9G 9-pin Loctal base

EH 
EH1 – Remote-cutoff hexode pentagrid converter, separate oscillator
EH2 – Remote-cutoff heptode pentagrid converter, separate oscillator
EH81 (E81H) – Heptode
EH90/6CS6 – Dual-control heptode for use in TV receivers
EH171 – Sharp-cutoff heptode, gnome tube
EH860 – Heptode
—Special quality:
EH900S/5915 – Dual-control switching heptode, designed for high speed digital computers
E91H/6687 – Dual-control heptode for use as a NAND gate in a coincidence circuit

EK 
EK1 – Octode pentagrid converter
EK2 – Octode pentagrid converter, similar to AK2, EK32 with a side-contact 8 base
EK3 – Beam octode pentagrid converter, CK3 with a different heater, similar to AK2, side-contact 8 base
EK32 – Octode pentagrid converter, EK2 with octal base and top cap
EK90/6BE6 – Heptode pentagrid converter

EL 
EL1 – Power Pentode
EL2 – Power pentode, EL32 with a side-contact 8 base with control grid on top cap
EL3 – Power pentode, EL11 or EL33 with a side-contact 8 base
EL3G (6V6) – EL3 with an Octal base
 – Power pentode, identical to AL5 except for heater ratings and to EL35 except for side-contact 8 base
EL6 – Power pentode, EL12 with a side-contact 8 base
EL8 – Power pentode, EL13 with a side-contact 8 base
EL11 – Power pentode, EL3(N) or EL33 with a Y8A 8-pin steel tube base
EL12 – Power pentode, EL6 with a Y8A 8-pin steel tube base
EL13 – Power pentode, EL8 with a Y8A 8-pin steel tube base
EL32 – Power pentode, EL2 with an Octal base
EL33 (6M6G) – Power pentode, EL3 or EL11 with an Octal base
EL34/6CA7 – Power pentode 
EL35 – Power pentode, EL5 with an Octal base
EL36/6CM5 – Audio or CRT horizontal deflection output power pentode, identical to EL12 except for Octal base and to XL36/13CM5 except for heater ratings
EL37/6L6 – Power pentode 
EL38/6CN6 – Power pentode, PL38 with a different heater
EL41/6CK5 (N150) – Power pentode, EL80 with a Rimlock base
EL42 (N151) – Power pentode, EL85 with a Rimlock base
EL44 – Power pentode, identical to UL44 except for heater ratings
EL50, 4654 – 80 W Power pentode
EL51 – 140 W Power pentode
EL60 – Power pentode, EL34 with a B9G 9-pin Loctal base
EL71/5902 – Subminiature 4 W AF power pentode, 8-pin all-glass wire-ended
EL80/6M5 – Power pentode, EL41 with a Noval base
EL81/6CJ6 – CRT horizontal deflection or stabilized power supply series regulator pentode
EL82/6DY5 – CRT vertical deflection or AF power pentode
EL83/6CK6 – CRT cathode drive power pentode
EL84/6BQ5 (N709) – AF Power pentode 
EL85/6BN5 – 6 W RF/AF power pentode up to 120 MHz, for use in mobile equipment, EL42 with a Noval base
EL86/6CW5 – Audio or CRT vertical deflection output power pentode, identical to LL86/10CW5, PL84/15CW5 and XL86/8CW5 except for heater ratings 
EL90/6AQ5 (N727) – 4.5 W AF Power pentode
EL91/6AM5 (M8082, 709) – 4 W AF Power pentode
EL95/6DL5 – Power pentode
EL112 – Radiation-cooled power transmitter pentode for 85W SW/VHF service, or for AF amplifiers. EL152 or EL401 with a Y8A 8-pin steel tube base
EL136 – Horizontal-output power pentode for 110° deflection color TV
EL151 – Power pentode, Y10A steel tube 10-pin base
 – Radiation-cooled power transmitter pentode for 85W SW/VHF service, or for AF amplifiers. EL112 or EL401 with a B10V glass 10-pin base with one big pin for the anode; FL152 with a different heater
EL153 – SW/VHF power pentode
EL156 – Power pentode, Y10A steel tube 10-pin base
EL171 – 4-Watts Power pentode, gnome tube
EL172 – 8-Watts Power pentode, gnome tube
EL173 – Power pentode, gnome tube, for TV receivers
EL180/12BY7 – Power pentode
EL183 – CRT cathode drive power pentode
EL300/6FN5 – CRT horizontal deflection output power pentode
EL360 – Power pentode for use in radar scanners, series regulators and pulse modulators
EL401 – Radiation-cooled power transmitter pentode for 85W SW/VHF service, or for AF amplifiers. EL112 or EL152 with a B8G Loctal base
EL500/6GB5 – CRT horizontal deflection output beam power pentode, magnoval base, identical to LL500/18GB5, PL500/27GB5 and XL500/13GB5 except for heater ratings
EL502 – CRT horizontal deflection output power pentode
EL503 – AF power pentode, magnoval base
EL504 – CRT horizontal deflection output power pentode, PL504 with a different heater
EL508 – CRT vertical deflection output power pentode, PL508/17KW6 with a different heater
EL509/6KG6A – CRT horizontal deflection output power pentode, PL509/40KG6A with a different heater
EL511 – Power pentode
EL519 – Power pentode, PL519 with a different heater
EL802 – CRT cathode drive power pentode for color TV, PL802 with a different heater
EL803 – Wide band power pentode
EL804 – Wide band power pentode
EL805 – CRT vertical deflection output power pentode, PL805 with a different heater
EL806 – CRT cathode drive power pentode
EL821/6CH6 (6132) – CRT cathode drive power pentode for use in high definition television equipment
EL822 – CRT cathode drive power pentode
 – Long-life RF power pentode for use as output amplifier in telecomms wide-area transmitters, identical to IL861 except for heater ratings
—Special quality:
EL3010 – Power pentode
EL5000 – AF power pentode
EL5070/8608 – Wideband video power pentode, magnoval base
EL8000 – Power pentode
E55L/8233 – Wide-band power pentode for use as CRT vertical deflection electrode driver in oscilloscopes
E80L/6227 – AF Power pentode, gold-plated pins
E81L/6686 – Long-life power pentode for use in telephone equipment, gold-plated pins (No relationship to EL81)
E84L/7320 – Power pentode for use in AF amplifiers and stabilized power supplies
E130L/7534 – Wide band power pentode
E235L/7751 – Power pentode
E236L – Power pentode

ELL 
ELL1 – Dual power pentode
ELL80/6HU8 – Dual power pentode, Noval base

EM 
EM1 (4678) – Top-view, "Magic Eye"-type tuning indicator, side-contact 8 Base
EM2 – Top-view, "Magic Eye"-type tuning indicator; has a 6.3 V/200 mA heater and was therefore marketed as C/EM2; identical AM2 except for heater ratings
EM4 – Dual-sensitivity, top-view, "Magic Eye"-type tuning indicator, EM34 with a side-contact 8 Base 
EM5 – Dual-sensitivity, top-view, "Magic Eye"-type tuning indicator, EM11 or EM35 with a side-contact 8 Base
EM11 – Dual-sensitivity, top-view, "Magic Eye"-type tuning indicator, EM5 or EM35 with a Y8A 8-pin steel tube base
EM34/6CD7 – Dual-sensitivity, top-view, "Magic Eye"-type tuning indicator, EM4 with an Octal base
EM35 – Dual-sensitivity, top-view, "Magic Eye"-type tuning indicator, EM5 or EM11 with an Octal base
Note: Telefunken EM35s appear to have a different pin-out than examples from other manufacturers
EM71 – Top-view, fan-type tuning indicator with an unusual offset cathode, B8G Loctal base, HM71 with a different heater, no relationship to DM71
EM72 – EM71 with two segments of the fluorescent screen uncoated with phosphor, intended for indicating low and peak levels but not average level, useless for tuning but intended for recording level indication
EM80/6BR5 – Side-view, fan-type tuning indicator for AM receivers, noval B9A base
EM81/6DA5 – EM80/6BR5 with 25% greater sensitivity
EM83 – Side-view, "Magic Balance" band-type dual-channel tuning/level indicator, two DC amplifier triodes and one electron gun for two separate screen anodes, noval B9A base, mainly for stereo use in tape recorders 
EM84/6DH7/6FG6 – Side-view, band-type tuning/level indicator, noval B9A base 
EM85 – Side-view, fan-type tuning indicator, identical to HM85 and UM85 except for heater ratings
EM87/6HU6 (CV10407) – Side-view, band-type tuning/level indicator, noval B9A base
EM171 – Dual-sensitivity, top-view, "Magic Eye"-type tuning indicator, gnome tube
EM800 – Side-view, bar graph-type tuning/level indicator, noval B9A base
EM840 – Side-view, band-type tuning/level indicator, noval B9A base
—Special quality:
E82M – Side-view, rectangle-type dual-channel level indicator, two DC amplifier triodes control separate deflection rods before a 17mmx20mm screen anode, noval B9A base

EMM 
EMM801 – Side-view, dual, band-type indicator with brightness control, for voltage comparison
EMM803 – Side-view, dual, band-type tuning indicator for FM-stereo receivers (field strength, 19kHz pilot present), noval B9A base

EN 
EN31 – 10 mAavg, 750 mApeak, Helium-filled, indirectly heated triode thyratron for high-frequency timebases and control equipment, Octal base with anode cap
EN32/6574 – 300 mAavg, 2 Apeak, 10 Asurge, Gas-filled, indirectly heated tetrode thyratron with negative control characteristic; for industrial control applications, Octal base
EN70 – 20 mAavg, 100 mApeak, Subminiature, gas-filled, indirectly heated tetrode thyratron with negative control characteristic, 8-pin all-glass wire-ended
/2D21 (PL21, PL2D21, CV797) – 100 mAavg, 500 mApeak, 10 Asurge, Gas-filled, indirectly heated tetrode thyratron, negative starter voltage, miniature 7-pin base, for relay and grid-controlled rectifier service
EN92 – 25 mAavg, 100 mApeak, 2 Asurge, Gas-filled, indirectly heated tetrode thyratron, negative starter voltage, miniature 7-pin base, for industrial control

EQ 
EQ40 – Nonode for FM quadrature detection
EQ80/6BE7 – Nonode for FM quadrature detection or as phase detector in TV flywheel sync circuits
EQ171 – Nonode, gnome tube

ES 
 – TV sync oscillator, a special power relaxation oscillator pentode, an attempt to cut costs on TV receiver production; one ES111 each were needed for vertical and horizontal deflection; the output power for the deflection yoke was extracted not from the anode, but from the screen grid, the sync pulses were applied to the suppressor grid via a separate pin. The anode acted only as a small-signal amplified/gated-sync output which was added to the feedback from an auxiliary winding on the deflection yoke, and fed to the control grid. As there was no vertical deflection output transformer, a secondary, magnetically decoupled vertical deflection yoke received a variable, smoothed-out part of the screen grid current to compensate for its DC component in the primary vertical deflection yoke; it was variable to adjust the vertical picture position on the CRT screen. The screen grid delivered enough power even for an EHT winding on the horizontal deflection output transformer and for the 6.3V/0.2A heater of an RFG5 16-kV EHT rectifier. Y8A 8-pin steel tube base with 2 unused pins, screen grid on top cap; compare US111

ET 
ET51 – Trochotron, an electron-beam decade counter tube
—Special quality:
E1T – Trochotron with side-viewing, fluorescent-screen readout
E80T/6218 (CV5724) – Modulated, single-anode beam deflection tube for pulse generation up to 375 MHz; shock resistant up to 500 g

EW 
EW60 – 700 VPIV, 400 mA, Gas-filled, half wave rectifier, B9G 9-pin Loctal base with 2 unused pins

EY 
EY1 – Half-wave rectifier, EY51 with a B4B 4-pin subminiature base
EY51/6X2 – Half-wave rectifier, wire-ended version of EY1
EY70 – 850 V half-wave rectifier, 4-pin all-glass wire-ended
 – CRT horizontal deflection output booster/damper/efficiency diode, identical to PY80 except for heater ratings
EY81/6R3 – TV horizontal output booster diode
/6N3 – Half-wave rectifier, PY82 with a different heater
EY83 – TV horizontal output booster diode, PY83 with a different heater
EY84 – Half-wave rectifier for operation at high altitudes
EY86 – Identical to DY86 except for heater ratings
EY87 – Identical to DY87 except for heater ratings. Electrically identical to DY86/EY86 but glass envelope treated for high humidity or low pressure conditions
EY88/6AL3 – TV horizontal output booster diode, identical to LY88/20AQ3, PY88/30AE3 and XY88/16AQ3 except for heater ratings
EY91 – Half-wave rectifier
EY500A/6EC4A – Identical to PY500A except for heater ratings
EY802 – Identical to DY802 except for heater ratings
EY3000 – 800 V, 750 mA Half-wave rectifier

EYY 
EYY13 – Dual rectifier, separate cathodes

EZ 
EZ1 – 250 V, 50 mA Full-wave power rectifier for 6V car radios, identical to FZ1 except for heater ratings
EZ2 – Full-wave power rectifier
EZ3 – Full-wave power rectifier
EZ4 – Full-wave power rectifier
EZ11 – Full-wave power rectifier for vehicle equipment
EZ12 – Full-wave power rectifier
EZ22 – Full-wave power rectifier
EZ35 – Full-wave power rectifier
EZ40 – Full-wave power rectifier, GZ40 with a different heater
EZ41 – Full-wave power rectifier
EZ80/6V4 – Full-wave power rectifier
EZ81/6CA4 – Full-wave power rectifier 
EZ90/6X4 – Full-wave power rectifier
EZ91 – Full-wave power rectifier
EZ150 – Dual power rectifier, separate cathodes, Y10A steel tube 10-pin base
—Special quality:
E90Z – Full-wave power rectifier

F - 12.6 V heater

FL 
FL152 – Identical to EL152 except for heater ratings

FZ 
FZ1 – 250 V, 50 mA Full wave power rectifier for 12V car radios, identical to EZ1 except for heater ratings

G - 5.0 V heater or misc.

GA 
GA560 – Directly heated saturated-emission vacuum noise diode, all-glass, 3-pin base

GY 
GY11 – Half-wave power rectifier, anode on top cap
GY86 – Half-wave, CRT EHT power rectifier, anode on top cap
GY501 – Half-wave, CRT EHT power rectifier for color TV, anode on top cap
GY802 – Half-wave, CRT EHT power rectifier, anode on top cap

GZ 
GZ30/5Z4-G – Full-wave power rectifier
GZ32/5V4/5AQ4 – Full-wave power rectifier
GZ33 – Full-wave power rectifier
GZ34/5AR4 – Full-wave power rectifier
GZ37 – Full-wave power rectifier
GZ40 – Full-wave power rectifier, EZ40 with a different heater
GZ41 – Full-wave power rectifier

H - 150 mA heater

HAA 
HAA91/12AL5 – Dual diode with separate cathodes, miniature 7-pin base, identical to EAA91/6AL5, UAA91 and XAA91/3AL5 except for heater ratings

HABC 
HABC80/19T8 – High-mu triode, triple diode (two on common cathode with triode, one with independent cathode), Noval base, used as an AF amplifier, AM detector and ratio detector in AC-powered post-war European AM/FM radios; identical to 5T8, 6T8, EABC80/6AK8, PABC80/9AK8 and UABC80/27AK8 except for heater ratings

HBC 
HBC90/12AT6 – High-mu triode and common cathode dual diode, miniature 7-pin base, EBC90/6AT6 with a different heater
HBC91/12AV6 – High-mu AF triode and common cathode dual diode, for use in FM ratio detectors, miniature 7-pin base, EBC91/6AV6 with a different heater

HCC 
HCC85/17EW8 – Dual triode for use as VHF oscillator/mixer up to 200 MHz, noval base, identical to ECC85/6AQ8, PCC85/9AQ8 and UCC85 except for heater ratings

HCH 
HCH81 – Remote-cutoff triode/heptode oscillator/mixer, noval base, UCH81/19D8 with a different heater

HF 
HF85 – Remote-cutoff wideband RF Pentode, identical to EF85/6BY7 and XF85 except for heater ratings
HF93/12BA6 – Remote-cutoff pentode, miniature 7-pin base, EF93/6BA6 with a different heater
HF94/12AU6 – Sharp-cutoff RF/IF/AF pentode, miniature 7-pin base, identical to EF94/6AU6 and XF94/3AU6 except for heater ratings

HK 
HK90 – Heptode pentagrid converter, miniature 7-pin, EK90 with a different heater

HL 
HL84 – Audio power pentode, noval base, UL84 with a different heater
HL90 – Audio power pentode, miniature 7-pin, EL90 with a different heater
HL92/50C5 – Audio beam power pentode, miniature 7-pin
HL94/30A5 – Audio power pentode, miniature 7-pin

HM 
HM34 – Dual-sensitivity, top-view, "Magic Eye"-type tuning indicator, EM34 with different heater ratings, UM4 with different basing and heater ratings
HM71 – Top-view, fan-type tuning indicator, octal B8D/F base, EM71 with a different heater
HM85 – Side-view, fan-type tuning indicator, identical to EM85 and UM85 except for heater ratings

HY 
HY90/35W4 – Half-wave rectifier, miniature 7-pin

I - 20 V heater

IF 
IF860 – Long-life sharp-cutoff RF pentode for use as preamplifier in telecomms wide-area receivers, identical to EF860 except for heater ratings (95mA)

IL 
IL861 – Long-life RF power pentode for use as output amplifier in telecomms wide-area transmitters, identical to EL861 except for heater ratings

K - 2.0 V heater

KA 
KA560 (6357) – Gas-filled, directly heated noise diode for the 10 cm band, waveguide output, BA15d lamp base with anode top cap
KA561 (6356) – Gas-filled, directly heated noise diode for the 7.5 cm band, waveguide output, BA15d lamp base with anode top cap
KA562 (6358) – Gas-filled, directly heated noise diode for the 3 cm band, waveguide output, BA15d lamp base with anode top cap
KA563 (6359) – Gas-filled, directly heated noise diode for the 1.25 cm band, waveguide output, BA15d lamp base with anode top cap
K50A (6358) – Neon-filled, directly heated noise diode for the 3 cm band, waveguide output, BA15d lamp base with anode top cap
K51A – Neon-filled, directly heated noise diode for the 10 cm band, waveguide output, BA15d lamp base with anode top cap
K81A – Directly heated saturated-emission vacuum VHF noise diode, noval base

KB 
KB1 – Directly heated dual diode with common cathode, poor performance as an AM detector lead to the introduction of the KB2; see introduction
KB2 – Indirectly heated dual diode with common cathode

KBC 
KBC1 – Dual diode - triode
KBC32 – Dual diode - triode

KC 
KC1 – Triode
KC3 – Triode
KC4 – Triode

KCF 
KCF30 – Triode and remote-cutoff pentode, oscillator/mixer

KCH 
KCH1 – Triode/hexode pentagrid converter

KDD 
KDD1 – 1.5 W Dual power triode

KF 
KF1 – RF/IF Pentode
KF2 – RF/IF Pentode
KF3 – Remote-cutoff RF/IF pentode
KF4 – RF/IF Pentode
KF7 – RF/IF Pentode
KF8 – Remote-cutoff RF/IF pentode
KF35 – Remote-cutoff RF pentode

KH 
KH1 – Hexode pentagrid converter

KK 
KK2 – Octode pentagrid converter, KK32 with a side-contact 8 base
KK32 – Octode pentagrid converter, KK2 with an Octal base

KL 
KL1 – Power pentode
KL2 – Power pentode
KL4 – Power pentode
KL5 – Power pentode
KL35 – 340 mW Power pentode

KLL 
KLL32 – 1.2W Dual power pentode

KY 
KY80 = U26 – CRT EHT rectifier. Noval base

L - 450 mA heater

LCF 
LCF80/6LN8 – VHF mixer/oscillator triode/pentode, identical to ECF80/6BL8, PCF80/9A8, UCF80 and XCF80/4BL8 except for heater ratings
LCF86/5HG8 – VHF mixer/oscillator triode/pentode, identical to ECF86/6HG8, PCF86/7HG8, 8HG8 and XCF86/4HG8 except for heater ratings
LCF201/5U9 – Triode and pentode for use as IF amplifier and sync sep in TV receivers, decal base, identical to ECF201/6U9 and PCF201 except for heater ratings
LCF801/5GJ7 – Medium-mu triode and sharp-cutoff pentode for use as VHF mixer in TV receivers, noval base, identical to ECF801/6GJ7, PCF801/8GJ7 and XCF801/4GJ7 except for heater ratings
LCF802/6LX8 – Medium-mu triode and sharp-cutoff pentode for use as reactance and sinewave oscillator in TV receivers, noval base, identical to ECF802/6JW8, PCF802/9JW8 and 5JW8 except for heater ratings

LCL 
LCL84/10DX8 – High-mu TV sync sep triode - sharp-cutoff CRT cathode drive power pentode, identical to ECL84/6DX8, PCL84/15DQ8 and XCL84/8DX8 except for heater ratings
LCL85/10GV8 – Triode - power pentode used in TV receivers for vertical timebase, generally as a multivibrator, with the pentode section doubling as one half of the multivibrator and the power output device, identical to ECL85/6GV8, PCL85/18GV8 and XCL85/9GV8 except for heater ratings

LF 
LF183/YF183/4EH7 – Frame-grid, remote-cutoff IF pentode for use in TV receivers, identical to EF183/6EH7 and XF183/3EH7 except for heater ratings
LF184/YF184/4EJ7 – Frame-grid, sharp-cutoff IF pentode for use in TV receivers, identical to EF184/6EJ7 and XF184/3EJ7 except for heater ratings

LFL 
LFL200/11Y9 – Sync sep pentode - CRT cathode drive power pentode, decal base; identical to EFL200/6Y9 and PFL200/16Y9 except for heater ratings

LL 
LL86/10CW5 – Audio or CRT vertical deflection output power pentode, identical to EL86/6CW5, PL84/15CW5 and XL86/8CW5 except for heater ratings
LL500/18GB5 – CRT horizontal deflection beam power pentode, magnoval base, identical to EL500/6GB5, PL500/27GB5 and XL500/13GB5 except for heater ratings

LY 
LY88/20AQ3 – TV horizontal output booster diode, identical to EY88/6AL3, PY88/30AE3 and XY88/16AQ3 except for heater ratings

M - 1.9 V heater

MC 
MC1 – AF triode for use in audions

MF 
MF2 = RV2P800 – RF pentode
MF6 = RV2P7 – RF pentode

N - 12.6 V heater

ND 
ND4 – 600 MHz, 10 W VHF power triode

NF 
NF2 – Sharp-cutoff RF pentode; identical to AF7 and CF7 except for heater ratings, and also produced by JRC in the then-axis power of Japan
NF3 – Remote-cutoff RF pentode identical to CF2 except for heater ratings
NF4 = RV12P4000 – RF pentode
NF6 = RV12P2000 – RF pentode

O - No heater 

Note: Philips sold a family of 150mA series heater tubes under this letter in South America: OBC3, OBF2, OCH4, OH4, OF1, OF5, OF9 and OM5

OZ 
OZ4 (0Z4) – 30 ≤ I ≤ 75 mA, Full-wave gas rectifier with common cathode, 6-pin octal base

P - 300 mA heater 

Note: Philips sold a family of 300mA series heater tubes under this letter in South America: PAB1, PBF2, PF9, PH4 and PM5

PABC 
PABC80/9AK8 – High-mu triode, triple low-voltage diode (two on common cathode with triode, one with independent cathode). Noval base, used as an AF amplifier, AM detector and ratio detector in AC-powered post-war European AM/FM radios and TV receivers; identical to EABC80/6AK8, 5T8, 6T8/6T8A, HABC80/19T8, UABC80/27AK8 and DH719 except for heater ratings

PC 
PC86/4CM4 – UHF Triode, EC86/6CM4 with a different heater
PC88/4DL4 – UHF Triode, EC88/6DL4 with a different heater
PC92 – RF Triode
PC93 – Triode
PC95/4ER5 – VHF Triode with variable mutual conductance, EC95 with a different heater
PC96 – Triode
PC97/4FY5 – Frame-grid VHF triode, identical to EC97/6FY5 and XC97 except for heater ratings
PC900/4HA5 – VHF Triode

PCC 
PCC84/7AN7 – Dual triode for VHF cascode amplifiers, noval base. Identical to ECC84/6CW7 and UCC84 except for heater ratings
PCC85/9AQ8 – Dual triode for use as VHF oscillator/mixer up to 200 MHz, noval base, identical to ECC85/6AQ8, HCC85/17EW8 and UCC85 except for heater ratings
PCC88/7DJ8 – Dual triode for use as cascode amplifiers, ECC88/6DJ8 with a different heater
PCC89 – Dual variable-mu triode for use as cascode amplifiers up to 220 MHz
PCC189/7ES8 – Dual variable-mu VHF triode for cascode amplifiers; identical to ECC189/6ES8, XCC189/4ES8 and YCC189/5ES8 except for heater ratings

PCF 
PCF80/9A8 – VHF mixer/oscillator triode/pentode, identical to ECF80/6BL8, LCF80/6LN8, UCF80 and XCF80/4BL8 except for heater ratings
PCF82/9U8A – Identical to ECF82/6U8 and XCF82 except for heater ratings
PCF86/7HG8 – VHF mixer/oscillator triode/pentode, identical to ECF86/6HG8, LCF86/5HG8, 8HG8 and XCF86/4HG8 except for heater ratings
PCF200 – Triode and pentode for use as IF amplifier in TV receivers, decal base, ECF200/6X9 with a different heater
PCF201 – Triode and pentode for use as IF amplifier and sync sep in TV receivers, decal base, identical to ECF201/6U9 and LCF201/5U9 except for heater ratings
PCF800 (30C15) – Triode - pentode
PCF801/8GJ7 – Triode and pentode for use as VHF mixer in TV receivers, noval base, identical to ECF801/6GJ7, LCF801/5GJ7 and XCF801/4GJ7 except for heater ratings
PCF802/9JW8 – Triode and pentode for use as reactance and sinewave oscillator in TV receivers, noval base, identical to ECF802/6JW8, LCF802/6LX8 and 5JW8 except for heater ratings
PCF803 – Triode - pentode
PCF805/7GV7 – Triode - pentode, ECF805 with a different heater
PCF806 – Triode - pentode
PCF812 – Triode - pentode

PCH 
PCH200/9V9 – Triode - Heptode, for TV sync sep, ECH200 with a different heater

PCL 
PCL81 – Identical to ECL81 except for heater ratings
PCL82/16A8 – AF triode - AF power pentode, identical to ECL82/6BM8, UCL82/50BM8 and XCL82 except for heater ratings
PCL83 – Triode - power pentode, ECL83 with a different heater and a lower mu triode.
PCL84/15DQ8 – TV sync sep triode - CRT cathode drive power pentode, identical to ECL84/6DX8, LCL84/10DX8 and XCL84/8DX8 except for heater ratings
PCL85/18GV8 – Triode - power pentode used in TV receivers for vertical timebase, generally as a multivibrator, with the pentode section doubling as one half of the multivibrator and the power output device, identical to ECL85/6GV8, LCL85/10GV8 and XCL85/9GV8 except for heater ratings
PCL86/14GW8 – AF Triode - AF power pentode, used for audio amplification in European TV receivers, ECL86/6GW8 with a different heater
PCL200 – Triode - power pentode, ECL200 with a different heater
PCL802 – Triode - power pentode
PCL805 – Triode - power pentode, ECL805 with a different heater

PD 
 – 25 kV Color CRT EHT shunt stabilizer triode; considerable x-radiation despite the envelope being fabricated from lead glass; may be replaced by the PD510 after rewiring the arc-safety shield pin of the socket. Identical to ED500 except for heater ratings
PD510 – PD500 with a higher PbO content in the glass, improving the x-radiation screening, and therefore should never be replaced by a PD500 in equipment designed for the PD510

PF 
PF83 – AF remote-cutoff pentode
PF86 – Pentode for use in Transitron circuits in TV receivers. Identical to EF86/6BK8 and UF86 except for heater ratings

PFL 
PFL200/16Y9 – Sync sep pentode and CRT cathode drive power pentode, decal base; identical to EFL200/6Y9 and LFL200/11Y9 except for heater ratings

PL 
PL11 – Power pentode
PL33 – CRT vertical deflection or AF output power pentode
PL36/25E5 – British high voltage high frequency switching pentode valve. Used in TV receivers for horizontal output and/or EHT generation up to c1964. Octal base, anode on top cap. Last consumer electronics use DECCA series DR101, 202, 303, 404, 505, 606 monochrome receivers
PL38 – CRT horizontal deflection output power pentode, EL38/6CN6 with a different heater
PL38M – PL38 with an externally metalised envelope on a separate pin
PL81/21A6 – CRT horizontal deflection output power pentode
PL81A – Similar to PL81 but optimised for portable television designs
PL82/16A5 – CRT vertical deflection output power pentode
PL83/15A6 (N309) – CRT cathode drive power pentode
PL84/15CW5 – Audio or CRT vertical deflection output power pentode, identical to EL86/6CW5, LL86/10CW5 and XL86/8CW5 except for heater ratings
PL95 – AF Power pentode
PL136 – Color TV 110° horizontal deflection output power pentode, octal base
PL500/28GB5 – CRT horizontal deflection beam power pentode, magnoval base, identical to EL500/6GB5, LL500/18GB5 and XL500/13GB5 except for heater ratings
PL502 – CRT horizontal deflection output power pentode
PL504 – CRT horizontal deflection output power pentode, replacement for PL500, EL504 with a different heater
PL508/17KW6 – CRT vertical deflection output power pentode for color TV, EL508 with a different heater
PL509/40KG6A – CRT horizontal deflection output power pentode for color TV, EL509/6KG6A with a different heater
PL511 – CRT horizontal deflection output power pentode
PL519 – CRT horizontal deflection output power pentode, EL519 with a different heater
PL521/29KQ6 – CRT horizontal deflection output power pentode, separate pin for grid 3 to minimize "snivets", magnoval base, identical to 21KQ6 except for heater ratings
PL802 – CRT cathode drive output pentode for color TV, EL802 with a different heater
PL805 – CRT vertical deflection output power pentode, EL805 with a different heater
PL820 – CRT horizontal deflection output power pentode

PLL 
PLL80/12HU8 – Dual AF power pentode

PM 
PM84 – Side-view, band-type tuning/level indicator, UM84/12FG6 with a different heater

PY 
PY31 – Half-wave rectifier
PY32 – Half-wave rectifier
PY33 – Half-wave rectifier
PY71 – Half-wave rectifier
PY80 – EY80 with a different heater
PY81 – TV horizontal output booster diode
PY82 – EY82 with a different heater
PY83 – CRT horizontal deflection output booster/damper/efficiency diode, EY83 with a different heater
PY88/30AE3 – TV horizontal output booster diode, identical to EY88/6AL3, LY88/20AQ3 and XY88/16AQ3 except for heater ratings
A/42EC4A – TV horizontal output booster diode for color TV; identical to EY500A/6EC4A except for heater ratings
PY800 – TV horizontal output booster diode

PZ 
PZ30 – Dual 200 mA rectifier, separate cathodes, octal base, for use as a voltage doubler in TV receivers

S - 1.9 V heater

SA 
SA100 – Instrumentation rectifier diode up to 3 GHz
SA101 – Instrumentation rectifier diode
SA102 – Instrumentation rectifier diode

SD 
SD1A – Shortwave power triode
SD3 – 750 MHz, 3.5 W VHF power triode

SF 
SF1A – Sharp-cutoff RF pentode, NF6 resp. RV12P2000 with a different heater

T - Custom heater 

Note: Tungsram preceded the M-P designation with the letter T, as in TAD1 for AD1

TY 
TY86F – 7.4 V, 77 mA heater version of the EY86 18-kV CRT EHT rectifier, for use as a hotfix in early-production Ferguson Radio Corporation TV receivers 306T and 308T where the horizontal-output transformer produced excessive heater voltage which destroyed the originally fitted EY86s.

U - 100 mA heater 

Note: Philips sold a family of 100mA series heater tubes under this letter in South America: UBC1, UBF2, UF8 and UL1

UAA 
UAA11 – Dual diode with separate cathodes
UAA91 – Dual diode with separate cathodes, miniature 7-pin base, identical to EAA91/6AL5, HAA91/12AL5 and XAA91/3AL5 except for heater ratings
UAA171 – Dual diode, separate cathodes, gnome tube

UABC 
UABC80/27AK8 – High-mu triode, triple low-voltage diode (two on common cathode with triode, one with independent cathode). Noval base, used as an AF amplifier, AM detector and ratio detector in series-heated post-war European AM/FM radios; identical to EABC80/6AK8, 5T8, 6T8/6T8A, HABC80/19T8, PABC80/9AK8 and DH719 except for heater ratings

UAF 
UAF21 – Diode - remote-cutoff pentode, EAF21 with a different heater
UAF41 – Diode - pentode, EAF41 with a different heater
UAF42/12S7 – Diode - remote-cutoff RF/IF/AF pentode

UB 
UB41 – Dual RF diode with separate cathodes, EB41 with a different heater

UBC 
UBC41 – Dual diode - AF triode, EBC81 with a Rimlock base and a different heater
UBC81 – Dual diode - AF triode, EBC41 with a Noval base and a different heater

UBF 
UBF11 – Dual diode - pentode, EBF11 with a different heater
UBF15 – Dual diode - pentode, EBF15 with a different heater
UBF80/17C8 – Dual diode - remote-cutoff pentode
UBF89 = 19FL8 – Dual diode - remote-cutoff pentode
UBF171 – Dual Diode and remote-cutoff RF/IF/AF pentode, gnome tube

UBL 
UBL1 – Dual diode - power pentode
UBL3 – Dual diode - power pentode
UBL21 – Dual diode - power pentode
UBL71 – Dual diode - power pentode

UC 
UC92/9AB4 – VHF triode for FM receiver frontends, single ECC81/12AT7 system, EC92/6AB4 with a different heater

UCC 
UCC84 – Dual triode for VHF cascode amplifiers, noval base. Identical to ECC84/6CW7 and PCC84/7AN7 except for heater ratings
UCC85 – Dual triode for use as VHF oscillator/mixer up to 200 MHz, noval base, identical to ECC85/6AQ8, HCC85/17EW8 and PCC85/9AQ8 except for heater ratings
UCC171 – Dual triode, gnome tube

UCF 
UCF12 – Triode - pentode, ECF12 with a different heater
UCF80 – VHF mixer/oscillator triode/pentode, identical to ECF80/6BL8, LCF80/6LN8, PCF80/9A8 and XCF80/4BL8 except for heater ratings
UCF174 – Triode and pentode, gnome tube

UCH 
UCH4 – Triode/heptode oscillator/mixer, UCH5 or UCH21 with an Octal base
UCH5 – Triode/hexode oscillator/mixer, UCH4 or UCH21 with a side-contact 8 base
UCH11 – Triode/hexode oscillator/mixer
UCH21 – Triode/heptode oscillator/mixer, UCH4 or UCH5 with a B8G 8-pin Loctal base
UCH41 – Remote-cutoff triode/hexode oscillator/mixer
UCH42/14K7 – Triode/hexode oscillator/mixer, Rimlock base, ECH42 with a different heater
UCH43 – Triode/hexode oscillator/mixer, low-microphonics version of UCH42; ECH43 with a different heater
UCH71 – Triode/heptode oscillator/mixer
UCH81/19D8 – Remote-cutoff triode/heptode oscillator/mixer, HCH81 with a different heater
UCH171 – Triode/remote-cutoff heptode Mixer, gnome tube

UCL 
UCL11 – Triode - power tetrode
UCL81 – Triode - power pentode, PCL81 with a different heater
UCL82/50BM8 – AF triode - AF power pentode, identical to ECL82/6BM8, PCL82/16A8 and XCL82 except for heater ratings
UCL83 – Triode - power pentode, PCL83 with a different heater

UEL 
UEL11 – Tetrode - power tetrode, VEL11 with a different heater
UEL51 – Tetrode - power pentode, Y10A steel tube 10-pin base
UEL71 – Tetrode - power pentode, EEL71 with a different heater
UEL171 – Remote-cutoff tetrode and 4-Watt power pentode, gnome tube

UF 
UF5 – Pentode
UF6 – Pentode
UF9 – Remote-cutoff pentode
UF11 – Pentode
UF14 – Sharp-cutoff pentode, Y8A 8-pin steel tube base, identical to EF14 and VF14 except for heater ratings
UF15 – Pentode, EF15 with a different heater
UF21 – Pentode
UF41 – Remote-cutoff RF pentode, EF41 with a different heater
UF42 – Wide band pentode, EF42 with a different heater
UF43 – Wide band, remote-cutoff pentode, EF43 with a different heater
UF80/19BX6 – RF Pentode
UF85/19BY7 – Remote-cutoff RF pentode
UF86 – Identical to EF86 and PF86 except for heater ratings
UF89 – Remote-cutoff IF pentode
UF172 – RF/IF/AF Pentode, gnome tube
UF174 – Pentode, gnome tube
UF175 – Remote-cutoff RF/IF pentode, gnome tube
UF176 – VHF Pentode, gnome tube
UF177 – VHF Pentode, gnome tube

UFM 
UFM11 – Remote-cutoff AF pentode and top-view, "Magic Eye"-type tuning indicator, EFM11 with a different heater

UH 
UH171 – Sharp-cutoff heptode, gnome tube

UL 
UL2 – Power pentode
UL11 – Power pentode
UL12 – Power pentode
UL21 – Power pentode
UL41/45A5 – AF power pentode
UL44 – Power pentode, identical to EL44 except for heater ratings
UL71 – Power pentode
UL84/45B5 – AF power pentode
UL171 – 4-Watts Power pentode, gnome tube

ULL 
ULL80 – Dual power pentode, ELL80 with a different heater

UM 
UM4 (10M2) – Dual-sensitivity, top-view, "Magic Eye"-type tuning indicator, Octal base, UM34 with a different pinout
UM11 – Dual-sensitivity, top-view, "Magic Eye"-type tuning indicator made by Telefunken; EM11 with a different heater
UM34 – Dual-sensitivity, top-view, "Magic Eye"-type tuning indicator, UM4 with a different pinout; HM34 with different heater ratings
UM35 = 10M2 – Dual-sensitivity, top-view, "Magic Eye"-type tuning indicator
UM80/19BR5 – Side-view, fan-type tuning indicator for AM receivers
UM81 – Side-view, fan-type tuning indicator
UM84/12FG6 – Side-view, band-type tuning/level indicator, PM84 with a different heater
UM85 – Side-view, fan-type tuning indicator, noval base, identical to EM85 and HM85 except for heater ratings
UM171 – Dual-sensitivity, top-view, "Magic Eye"-type tuning indicator, gnome tube

UQ 
UQ80 – Nonode, EQ80/6BE7 with a different heater
UQ171 – Nonode, gnome tube

US 
US111 – TV sync oscillator, a special relaxation oscillator pentode with the suppressor grid on a separate pin to act as a second control grid; Y8A 8-pin steel tube base with 2 unused pins, screen grid on top cap. See ES111

UY 
UY1 – Half-wave rectifier 
UY2 – Half-wave rectifier
UY3 – Half-wave rectifier
UY4 – Half-wave rectifier
UY11 – Half-wave rectifier
UY21 – Half-wave rectifier
UY31 – Half-wave rectifier
UY41/31A3 – Half-wave rectifier
UY42 – Half-wave rectifier
UY82/55N3 – Half-wave rectifier
UY85/38A3 – Half-wave rectifier
UY89 – Half-wave rectifier
UY92 – Half-wave rectifier

V - 50 mA heater 
Notes:
Apart from AC/DC radios, "V" tubes were also used in miniaturized equipment with only one single supply for both anode and heater.
VATEA Rádiótechnikai és Villamossági Rt.-t. (VATEA Radio Technology and Electric Co. Ltd., Budapest, Hungary) preceded the M-P designation with the letter V, as in VEL5 for EL5.

VBF 
VBF11 – Dual diode and pentode, EBF11 with a 38 V heater

VC 
VC1 – Triode, side-contact 8 base with grid on top cap, 55 V heater

VCH 
VCH11 – Triode/hexode mixer, Y8A 8-pin steel tube base, ECH11 with a 38 V heater

VCL 
VCL11 – Triode - power tetrode, 90 V heater, Y8A 8-pin steel tube base

VEL 
VEL11 – AF Tetrode - AF beam power tetrode, Y8A 8-pin steel tube base with E-tetrode grid on top cap, UEL11 with a 90 V heater

VF 
VF3 – Pentode, AF3 with a 55 V heater
VF7 – Pentode, AF7 with a 55 V heater
VF14 – Sharp-cutoff pentode, 55 V heater, Y8A 8-pin steel tube base, identical to EF14 and UF14 except for heater ratings
VF14M – Selected VF14 in production until the end of the 1950s for use as a preamplifier in Neumann condenser microphones U-47 and U-48 where they were run at only half their rated heater power to reduce noise

VL 
VL1 – 1.6 W AF Pentode, side-contact 8 base, CL1 with a 55 V heater
VL4 – 4 W AF Pentode, side-contact 8 base, CL4 with a 110 V heater

VY 
VY1 – 60 mA Half-wave rectifier, 55 V heater, side-contact 8 base
VY2 – 250 V, 20 mA Half-wave rectifier, 30 V heater, side-contact 5 base

X - 600 mA heater

XAA 
XAA91/3AL5 – Dual diode with separate cathodes, miniature 7-pin base, identical to EAA91/6AL5, HAA91/12AL5 and UAA91 except for heater ratings

XC 
XC95 – Triode, PC95 with a different heater
XC97 – Frame-grid VHF triode, identical to EC97/6FY5 and PC97/4FY5 except for heater ratings

XCC 
XCC82 – Dual triode, identical to ECC82/12AU7 except for heater ratings
XCC189/4ES8 – Dual VHF triode for cascode amplifiers; identical to ECC189/6ES8, PCC189/7ES8 and YCC189/5ES8 except for heater ratings

XCF 
XCF80/4BL8 – VHF mixer/oscillator triode/pentode, identical to ECF80/6BL8, PCF80/9A8, LCF80/6LN8 and UCF80 except for heater ratings
XCF82 – Triode and pentode, identical to ECF82/6U8 and PCF82/9U8A except for heater ratings
XCF801/4GJ7 – Triode and pentode for use as VHF mixer in TV receivers, noval base, identical to ECF801/6GJ7, LCF801/5GJ7 and PCF801/8GJ7 except for heater ratings

XCH 
XCH81 – Triode/heptode oscillator/mixer, ECH81/6AJ8 with a different heater

XCL 
XCL82 – AF triode - AF power pentode, identical to ECL82/6BM8, PCL82/16A8 and UCL82/50BM8 except for heater ratings
XCL84/8DX8 – TV sync sep triode - CRT cathode drive power pentode, identical to ECL84/6DX8, LCL84/10DX8 and PCL84/15DQ8 except for heater ratings
XCL85/9GV8 – Triode and power pentode for TV vertical output. Identical to ECL85/6GV8, LCL85/10GV8 and PCL85/18GV8 except for heater ratings

XF 
XF80 – RF/IF/Video pentode, identical to EF80/6BX6 and UF80 with a different heater, noval base
XF85 – Remote-cutoff wideband RF pentode, noval base, identical to EF85/6BY7 and HF85 except for heater ratings
XF94/3AU6 – Sharp-cutoff RF/IF/AF Pentode, miniature 7-pin base, identical to EF94/6AU6 and HF94/12AU6 except for heater ratings
XF183/3EH7 – Frame-grid, remote-cutoff IF pentode for use in TV receivers, identical to EF183/6EH7 and LF183/YF183/4EH7 except for heater ratings
XF184/3EJ7 – Frame-grid, sharp-cutoff IF pentode for use in TV receivers, identical to EF184/6EJ7 and LF184/YF184/4EJ7 except for heater ratings

XL 
XL36/13CM5 – Audio or CRT horizontal deflection output power pentode, EL36/6CM5 with a different heater
XL84 – Power pentode, EL84 with a different heater
XL86/8CW5 – Audio or CRT vertical deflection output power pentode, identical to EL86/6CW5, LL86/10CW5 and PL84/15CW5 except for heater ratings
XL500/13GB5 – CRT horizontal deflection beam power pentode, magnoval base, identical to EL500/6GB5, LL500/18GB5 and PL500/27GB5 except for heater ratings

XY 
XY88/16AQ3 – TV horizontal output booster diode, identical to EY88/6AL3, LY88/20AQ3 and PY88/30AE3 except for heater ratings

Y - 450 mA heater

YCC 
YCC189/5ES8 – Dual VHF triode for cascode amplifiers; identical to ECC189/6ES8, PCC189/7ES8 and XCC189/4ES8 except for heater ratings

YF 
YF183/LF183/4EH7 – Frame-grid, remote-cutoff IF pentode for use in TV receivers, identical to EF183/6EH7 and XF183/3EH7 except for heater ratings
YF184/LF184/4EJ7 – Frame-grid, sharp-cutoff IF pentode for use in TV receivers, identical to EF184/6EJ7 and XF184/3EJ7 except for heater ratings

Z - Cold cathode tube 
Notes: Special-quality cold-cathode "Z" tubes had a different function letter scheme.

See also the professional tubes under Z

ZA 
Z960A – Cold-cathode surge protector for receiver frontends

ZC 
Z302C – Unusual decade Counter Dekatron, a counterclockwise-only decade counter tube with separate odd and even extinguishing electrodes except "0", which is tied to a -300V supply so reaching the terminal count produces a negative spike on the anode voltage which can be used to advance the next counter stage with no intermediate active components
Z303C – Neon-filled, 4 kHz bidirecional decade Counter Dekatron
Z563C – Neon-filled 4 kHz bidirecional decade Counter Dekatron
Z565C – 4 kHz Bidirecional decade Counter Dekatron
Z573C – Neon-filled 4 kHz bidirecional decade Counter Dekatron with aux anodes for direct control of Nixie tubes

ZE 
Z862E – Noble gas-filled, cold-cathode electrometer tube, control current 10 pA, silicone-coated envelope for isolation, guard ring, envelope inside radioactively coated for a constant ignition voltage

ZM 
ZM11 – Neon-filled digital indicator tube, 21 mm character height, top-viewing, showing a cross with a central dot and independent arms, for use in industrial control panels
ZM13 – Neon-filled digital indicator tube, 21 mmCH, top-viewing, showing a vertical line and a circle with a small gap, for use in industrial control panels
ZM13U – Neon-filled digital indicator tube, 21 mmCH, top-viewing, showing a vertical line and a circle, for use in industrial control panels
ZM14 – Neon-filled digital indicator tube, 21 mmCH, top-viewing, showing a vertical line, a circle, a triangle and a three-winged star, for use in industrial control panels
Z510M –  0 1 2 3 4 5 6 7 8 9  Neon-filled digital indicator tube, 15.5 mmCH, top-viewing, no decimal point
Z520M See ZM1020
Z521M See ZM1021
Z522M See ZM1040
Z550M See ZM1050
Z560M – Z5600M with a red contrast filter coating
Z561M – Z5610M with a red contrast filter coating
Z565M – Gas-filled digital indicator tube with a dekatron-type readout, similar to GR10A, Z503M and ZM1050
Z566M – Z5660M with a red contrast filter coating
Z567M – Z5670M with a red contrast filter coating
Z568M – Z5680M with a red contrast filter coating
Z570M – Z5700M with a red contrast filter coating
Z571M – Z5710M with a red contrast filter coating
Z573M – Z5730M with a red contrast filter coating
Z574M – Z5740M with a red contrast filter coating
Z580M – Z5800M with a red contrast filter coating
Z581M – Z5810M with a red contrast filter coating
Z590M – Z5900M with a red contrast filter coating
Z870M – Z8700M with a red contrast filter coating
Z5200M See ZM1022
Z5220M See ZM1042
Z5600M –  0 1 2 3 4 5 6 7 8 9  Neon-filled digital indicator tube, 15.5 mmCH, top-viewing, no decimal point
Z5610M –  A V Ω + - ~ % W  Neon-filled digital indicator tube, 15.5 mmCH top-viewing, for use in digital multimeters
Z5660M –  0 1 2 3 4 5 6 7 8 9  Neon-filled digital indicator tube, 30 mmCH, side-viewing, no decimal point
Z5670M –  + - ~  Neon-filled digital indicator tube, 18/30 mmCH side-viewing
Z5680M –  0 1 2 3 4 5 6 7 8 9  Neon-filled digital indicator tube, 50 mmCH side-viewing, no decimal point
Z5700M –  0 1 2 3 4 5 6 7 8 9  Neon-filled digital indicator tube, 13 mmCH side-viewing, no decimal point
Z5710M –  + - ~  Neon-filled digital indicator tube, 10.5/13 mmCH side-viewing
Z5730M –  0 1 2 3 4 5 6 7 8 9  Neon-filled digital indicator tube, 13 mmCH side-viewing, right decimal points
Z5740M –  0 1 2 3 4 5 6 7 8 9  Neon-filled digital indicator tube, 13 mmCH side-viewing, left decimal points
Z5800M –    Neon-filled digital indicator tube, 13 mmCH side-viewing
Z5810M –  A F H S V Ω Hz s  Neon-filled digital indicator tube, 13 mmCH side-viewing, for use in digital multimeters
Z5900M –  0 1 2 3 4 5 6 7 8 9  Neon-filled digital indicator tube, 10 mmCH side-viewing, both left and right decimal points
Z8700M –  0 1 2 3 4 5 6 7 8 9  Neon-filled digital indicator tube, 10 mmCH side-viewing, no decimal point, 5 dual cathodes and separate odd/even anode compartments for biquinary multiplexing

Note: More Nixie tubes under professional - ZM and ETL examples

ZS 
Z502S – Neon-filled, 4 kHz max. decade Counter/Selector Dekatron
Z504S (ZM1070, 8433) – Neon-filled, 5 kHz max. decade Counter/Selector Dekatron
Z505S (ZM1060) – Argon-filled, 50 kHz max. decade Counter/Selector Dekatron
Z562S – Neon-filled, 4 kHz max. decade Counter/Selector Dekatron, envelope inside radioactively coated for a constant ignition voltage
Z564S – 25 kHz max. Decade Counter/Selector Dekatron, envelope inside radioactively coated for a constant ignition voltage
Z572S – Neon-filled, 5 kHz max. decade Counter/Selector Dekatron, aux anodes to directly drive Nixie tubes, envelope inside radioactively coated for a constant ignition voltage

ZT 
Z50T – Subminiature, 6 mAavg, 24 mApeak, Gas-filled, cold-cathode trigger triode, 1 starter, 3-pin all-glass wire-ended, for use as switch in bang–bang controllers
Z300T (PL1267) – 25 mAavg, 100 mApeak, Gas-filled, cold-cathode DC trigger triode, one starter, octal base
Z900T/5823 – 25 mAavg, 100 mApeak, Gas-filled, cold-cathode AC trigger triode, one starter, miniature 7-pin base

ZU 
Z70U/7710 – Subminiature, 3 mAavg, 12 mApeak, Gas-filled, cold-cathode DC trigger tetrode, one starter and a primer electrode, positive starter voltage, 4-pin all-glass wire-ended
Z71U/7711 – Subminiature, 7 mAavg, 12 mApeak, Gas-filled, cold-cathode DC trigger tetrode, two starters, positive starter voltage, low impedance for audio frequencies for use in a telephone exchange, 4-pin all-glass wire-ended
Z700U – Subminiature, 4 mAavg, 16 mApeak, Gas-filled, cold-cathode DC trigger tetrode, one starter and a primer electrode, positive starter voltage, all-glass wire-ended, for use in Dekatron circuits up to 2...5 kHz
Z701U – Subminiature, Gas-filled, cold-cathode trigger tetrode, all-glass wire-ended
Z800U – 2.5 mAavg, 10 mApeak, Gas-filled, cold-cathode DC trigger tetrode, one starter and a primer electrode, positive starter voltage, noval base, for voltage control, sensitive relay circuits and timers
Z801U – 2.5 mAavg, 10 mApeak, Gas-filled, cold-cathode DC trigger tetrode, one starter and a primer electrode, negative starter voltage, noval base, for use with Geiger-Müller tubes
Z803U/6779 – 25 mAavg, 100 mApeak, Gas-filled, cold-cathode DC trigger tetrode, one starter and a primer electrode, positive starter voltage, noval base, for voltage control, sensitive relay circuits and timers
Z804U/7713 – 5 mAavg, 25 mApeak, Gas-filled, cold-cathode AC trigger tetrode, one starter and a primer envelope coating, negative starter voltage, noval base, direct operation from a 200...250VAC mains grid but should be triggered only while VA > 0
Z805U/7714 – 5 mAavg, 25 mApeak, Gas-filled, cold-cathode AC trigger tetrode, one starter, two primers and separate cathode and anode shields on individual pins, positive starter voltage, noval base, direct operation from a 200...250VAC mains grid, for relay drivers, timers, photoelectric controls, etc.

ZW 
Z70W/7709 – 4 mA, Gas-filled, cold-cathode DC trigger pentode, two starters and a primer electrode, positive starter voltage, 5-pin all-glass wire-ended, for use in bidirectional counters
Z660W (GR43) – 12 mAavg, 50 mApeak, Gas-filled, cold-cathode DC trigger pentode, two starters and a primer electrode, positive starter voltage, 5-pin all-glass wire-ended, envelope inside radioactively coated for a constant ignition voltage, for use in bidirectional counters
Z661W (ZC1010) – 8 mAavg, 50 mApeak, Gas-filled, cold-cathode AC trigger pentode, two starters and a primer electrode, positive starter voltage, 5-pin all-glass wire-ended, envelope inside radioactively coated for a constant ignition voltage, for use in bidirectional counters
Z700W – 4 mA, Gas-filled, cold-cathode DC trigger pentode, two starters and a primer electrode, positive starter voltage, 5-pin all-glass wire-ended, for use in bidirectional counters
Z806W – Gas-filled, cold-cathode trigger tetrode, one starter and dual primer, noval base, used in elevator controls
Z865W – 25 mAavg, 200 mApeak Gas-filled, cold-cathode AC/DC trigger tetrode, one starter and a primer electrode, low positive starter voltage for transistorized circuits, Noval base, envelope inside radioactively coated for a constant ignition voltage, for use as a relay driver

ZX 
Z860X – 40 mAavg, 200 mApeak, Gas-filled, cold-cathode DC trigger pentode, two starters, a primer electrode and an internal shield, positive starter voltage, noval base, envelope inside radioactively coated for a constant ignition voltage, for use in counters
Z861X – 40 mAavg, 200 mApeak, Gas-filled, cold-cathode AC trigger pentode, two starters, a primer electrode and an internal shield, positive starter voltage, noval base, envelope inside radioactively coated for a constant ignition voltage, for use in counters
Z863X – 40 mAavg, 200 mApeak, Gas-filled, cold-cathode DC trigger pentode, two starters, a primer electrode and an internal shield, negative starter voltage, noval base, envelope inside radioactively coated for a constant ignition voltage, for use in counters

References and footnotes

Specific items

General literature and data sheets
 Frank Philipse's Tube Datasheet Archive
Mirrors in Brazil • Brazil searchable • Germany • Germany • Hong Kong • Poland • Poland searchable • Romania • Romania searchable • Sweden • USA
 Tubebooks.org datasheet collection
 Roy J. Tellason's tube datasheet collection
 Klausmobile Russian tube directory
 General Electric Essential Characteristics, 1970

 RCA Receiving Tube Manuals R10 (1932) • RC11 (1933) • RC12 (1934) • RC13 (1937) • RC14 (1942) • RC15 (1948) • RC16 (1951) • RC17 (1954) • RC18 (1956) • RC19 (1959) • RC20 (1960) • RC21 (1961) • RC22 (1963) • RC23 (1964) • RC24 (1965) • RC25 (1966) • RC26 (1968) • RC27 (1970) • RC28 (1971) • RC29 (1973) • RC30 (1975)
 Scanned tube documentation (PDFs): Tubebooks • Frank Philipse • 4tubes
 Sylvania Technical Manual, 1958
 J. P. Hawker (ed), Radio and television servicing, Newnes, London, 1964
Camera tube datasheets

 •  Decoding type numbers
Decoding Valve, Transistor and CRT Numbers
Vacuum Tube Numbering Schemes, Bases & Bulbs
 European tube designation systems:  •  •

See also

List of vacuum tubes

External links

Vacuum Tube Data Sheet Locator
Tube Substitution and Characteristics Guide
British virtual thermionic valve museum with good quality pictures and data
Belgian virtual thermionic valve museum with good quality pictures and data
Radio museum
Virtual Valve Museum

Electronics lists
Gas-filled tubes